

194001–194100 

|-bgcolor=#fefefe
| 194001 ||  || — || September 12, 2001 || Kitt Peak || Spacewatch || — || align=right data-sort-value="0.98" | 980 m || 
|-id=002 bgcolor=#fefefe
| 194002 ||  || — || September 17, 2001 || Desert Eagle || W. K. Y. Yeung || NYS || align=right data-sort-value="0.85" | 850 m || 
|-id=003 bgcolor=#fefefe
| 194003 ||  || — || September 17, 2001 || Desert Eagle || W. K. Y. Yeung || — || align=right | 1.3 km || 
|-id=004 bgcolor=#fefefe
| 194004 ||  || — || September 18, 2001 || Kleť || Kleť Obs. || — || align=right | 1.7 km || 
|-id=005 bgcolor=#fefefe
| 194005 ||  || — || September 16, 2001 || Socorro || LINEAR || — || align=right | 2.8 km || 
|-id=006 bgcolor=#FFC2E0
| 194006 ||  || — || September 19, 2001 || Anderson Mesa || LONEOS || APOPHA || align=right data-sort-value="0.31" | 310 m || 
|-id=007 bgcolor=#fefefe
| 194007 ||  || — || September 16, 2001 || Socorro || LINEAR || FLO || align=right | 1.1 km || 
|-id=008 bgcolor=#fefefe
| 194008 ||  || — || September 16, 2001 || Socorro || LINEAR || FLO || align=right data-sort-value="0.74" | 740 m || 
|-id=009 bgcolor=#fefefe
| 194009 ||  || — || September 16, 2001 || Socorro || LINEAR || EUT || align=right data-sort-value="0.86" | 860 m || 
|-id=010 bgcolor=#d6d6d6
| 194010 ||  || — || September 16, 2001 || Socorro || LINEAR || THM || align=right | 3.7 km || 
|-id=011 bgcolor=#fefefe
| 194011 ||  || — || September 16, 2001 || Socorro || LINEAR || — || align=right | 1.3 km || 
|-id=012 bgcolor=#fefefe
| 194012 ||  || — || September 16, 2001 || Socorro || LINEAR || — || align=right | 2.3 km || 
|-id=013 bgcolor=#fefefe
| 194013 ||  || — || September 16, 2001 || Socorro || LINEAR || — || align=right data-sort-value="0.92" | 920 m || 
|-id=014 bgcolor=#fefefe
| 194014 ||  || — || September 16, 2001 || Socorro || LINEAR || V || align=right data-sort-value="0.89" | 890 m || 
|-id=015 bgcolor=#fefefe
| 194015 ||  || — || September 16, 2001 || Socorro || LINEAR || — || align=right data-sort-value="0.94" | 940 m || 
|-id=016 bgcolor=#fefefe
| 194016 ||  || — || September 16, 2001 || Socorro || LINEAR || — || align=right | 1.4 km || 
|-id=017 bgcolor=#fefefe
| 194017 ||  || — || September 16, 2001 || Socorro || LINEAR || — || align=right | 1.0 km || 
|-id=018 bgcolor=#fefefe
| 194018 ||  || — || September 16, 2001 || Socorro || LINEAR || — || align=right data-sort-value="0.93" | 930 m || 
|-id=019 bgcolor=#fefefe
| 194019 ||  || — || September 16, 2001 || Socorro || LINEAR || FLO || align=right data-sort-value="0.92" | 920 m || 
|-id=020 bgcolor=#fefefe
| 194020 ||  || — || September 16, 2001 || Socorro || LINEAR || MAS || align=right data-sort-value="0.88" | 880 m || 
|-id=021 bgcolor=#fefefe
| 194021 ||  || — || September 16, 2001 || Socorro || LINEAR || — || align=right | 1.2 km || 
|-id=022 bgcolor=#d6d6d6
| 194022 ||  || — || September 16, 2001 || Socorro || LINEAR || — || align=right | 4.7 km || 
|-id=023 bgcolor=#fefefe
| 194023 ||  || — || September 16, 2001 || Socorro || LINEAR || V || align=right data-sort-value="0.99" | 990 m || 
|-id=024 bgcolor=#fefefe
| 194024 ||  || — || September 16, 2001 || Socorro || LINEAR || — || align=right | 1.4 km || 
|-id=025 bgcolor=#fefefe
| 194025 ||  || — || September 16, 2001 || Socorro || LINEAR || FLO || align=right data-sort-value="0.80" | 800 m || 
|-id=026 bgcolor=#fefefe
| 194026 ||  || — || September 16, 2001 || Socorro || LINEAR || NYS || align=right data-sort-value="0.83" | 830 m || 
|-id=027 bgcolor=#fefefe
| 194027 ||  || — || September 17, 2001 || Socorro || LINEAR || FLO || align=right | 1.1 km || 
|-id=028 bgcolor=#fefefe
| 194028 ||  || — || September 17, 2001 || Socorro || LINEAR || — || align=right | 1.2 km || 
|-id=029 bgcolor=#fefefe
| 194029 ||  || — || September 17, 2001 || Socorro || LINEAR || — || align=right | 1.0 km || 
|-id=030 bgcolor=#fefefe
| 194030 ||  || — || September 17, 2001 || Socorro || LINEAR || — || align=right | 1.4 km || 
|-id=031 bgcolor=#fefefe
| 194031 ||  || — || September 19, 2001 || Anderson Mesa || LONEOS || — || align=right | 1.2 km || 
|-id=032 bgcolor=#fefefe
| 194032 ||  || — || September 19, 2001 || Socorro || LINEAR || PHO || align=right | 1.5 km || 
|-id=033 bgcolor=#fefefe
| 194033 ||  || — || September 19, 2001 || Socorro || LINEAR || — || align=right | 1.2 km || 
|-id=034 bgcolor=#fefefe
| 194034 ||  || — || September 19, 2001 || Socorro || LINEAR || — || align=right | 1.2 km || 
|-id=035 bgcolor=#fefefe
| 194035 ||  || — || September 20, 2001 || Socorro || LINEAR || — || align=right | 1.4 km || 
|-id=036 bgcolor=#fefefe
| 194036 ||  || — || September 20, 2001 || Socorro || LINEAR || — || align=right | 1.2 km || 
|-id=037 bgcolor=#fefefe
| 194037 ||  || — || September 20, 2001 || Socorro || LINEAR || FLO || align=right data-sort-value="0.83" | 830 m || 
|-id=038 bgcolor=#d6d6d6
| 194038 ||  || — || September 20, 2001 || Socorro || LINEAR || SYL7:4 || align=right | 6.9 km || 
|-id=039 bgcolor=#fefefe
| 194039 ||  || — || September 20, 2001 || Socorro || LINEAR || — || align=right | 1.5 km || 
|-id=040 bgcolor=#fefefe
| 194040 ||  || — || September 20, 2001 || Socorro || LINEAR || — || align=right | 1.6 km || 
|-id=041 bgcolor=#fefefe
| 194041 ||  || — || September 20, 2001 || Socorro || LINEAR || — || align=right | 1.3 km || 
|-id=042 bgcolor=#fefefe
| 194042 ||  || — || September 20, 2001 || Socorro || LINEAR || NYS || align=right data-sort-value="0.82" | 820 m || 
|-id=043 bgcolor=#fefefe
| 194043 ||  || — || September 20, 2001 || Socorro || LINEAR || NYS || align=right data-sort-value="0.85" | 850 m || 
|-id=044 bgcolor=#fefefe
| 194044 ||  || — || September 20, 2001 || Socorro || LINEAR || FLO || align=right | 1.8 km || 
|-id=045 bgcolor=#fefefe
| 194045 ||  || — || September 20, 2001 || Socorro || LINEAR || V || align=right data-sort-value="0.77" | 770 m || 
|-id=046 bgcolor=#fefefe
| 194046 ||  || — || September 20, 2001 || Socorro || LINEAR || — || align=right | 1.0 km || 
|-id=047 bgcolor=#fefefe
| 194047 ||  || — || September 20, 2001 || Socorro || LINEAR || — || align=right data-sort-value="0.90" | 900 m || 
|-id=048 bgcolor=#fefefe
| 194048 ||  || — || September 20, 2001 || Socorro || LINEAR || NYS || align=right data-sort-value="0.58" | 580 m || 
|-id=049 bgcolor=#fefefe
| 194049 ||  || — || September 20, 2001 || Socorro || LINEAR || — || align=right | 1.5 km || 
|-id=050 bgcolor=#fefefe
| 194050 ||  || — || September 20, 2001 || Socorro || LINEAR || — || align=right | 1.0 km || 
|-id=051 bgcolor=#fefefe
| 194051 ||  || — || September 20, 2001 || Socorro || LINEAR || FLO || align=right | 1.3 km || 
|-id=052 bgcolor=#fefefe
| 194052 ||  || — || September 20, 2001 || Socorro || LINEAR || V || align=right | 1.2 km || 
|-id=053 bgcolor=#fefefe
| 194053 ||  || — || September 16, 2001 || Socorro || LINEAR || V || align=right data-sort-value="0.86" | 860 m || 
|-id=054 bgcolor=#fefefe
| 194054 ||  || — || September 16, 2001 || Socorro || LINEAR || FLO || align=right data-sort-value="0.92" | 920 m || 
|-id=055 bgcolor=#fefefe
| 194055 ||  || — || September 16, 2001 || Socorro || LINEAR || — || align=right data-sort-value="0.97" | 970 m || 
|-id=056 bgcolor=#fefefe
| 194056 ||  || — || September 16, 2001 || Socorro || LINEAR || — || align=right | 1.3 km || 
|-id=057 bgcolor=#fefefe
| 194057 ||  || — || September 16, 2001 || Socorro || LINEAR || — || align=right | 1.4 km || 
|-id=058 bgcolor=#fefefe
| 194058 ||  || — || September 16, 2001 || Socorro || LINEAR || — || align=right | 1.1 km || 
|-id=059 bgcolor=#fefefe
| 194059 ||  || — || September 16, 2001 || Socorro || LINEAR || — || align=right | 2.1 km || 
|-id=060 bgcolor=#fefefe
| 194060 ||  || — || September 16, 2001 || Socorro || LINEAR || — || align=right | 1.3 km || 
|-id=061 bgcolor=#fefefe
| 194061 ||  || — || September 16, 2001 || Socorro || LINEAR || — || align=right | 1.0 km || 
|-id=062 bgcolor=#fefefe
| 194062 ||  || — || September 16, 2001 || Socorro || LINEAR || FLO || align=right | 1.4 km || 
|-id=063 bgcolor=#fefefe
| 194063 ||  || — || September 16, 2001 || Socorro || LINEAR || — || align=right | 1.1 km || 
|-id=064 bgcolor=#fefefe
| 194064 ||  || — || September 16, 2001 || Socorro || LINEAR || FLO || align=right data-sort-value="0.87" | 870 m || 
|-id=065 bgcolor=#fefefe
| 194065 ||  || — || September 16, 2001 || Socorro || LINEAR || — || align=right | 1.1 km || 
|-id=066 bgcolor=#fefefe
| 194066 ||  || — || September 16, 2001 || Socorro || LINEAR || — || align=right | 1.1 km || 
|-id=067 bgcolor=#d6d6d6
| 194067 ||  || — || September 16, 2001 || Socorro || LINEAR || SYL7:4 || align=right | 6.5 km || 
|-id=068 bgcolor=#fefefe
| 194068 ||  || — || September 16, 2001 || Socorro || LINEAR || FLO || align=right data-sort-value="0.79" | 790 m || 
|-id=069 bgcolor=#fefefe
| 194069 ||  || — || September 16, 2001 || Socorro || LINEAR || — || align=right | 1.0 km || 
|-id=070 bgcolor=#fefefe
| 194070 ||  || — || September 16, 2001 || Socorro || LINEAR || — || align=right | 1.2 km || 
|-id=071 bgcolor=#fefefe
| 194071 ||  || — || September 16, 2001 || Socorro || LINEAR || — || align=right | 1.0 km || 
|-id=072 bgcolor=#fefefe
| 194072 ||  || — || September 16, 2001 || Socorro || LINEAR || NYS || align=right data-sort-value="0.79" | 790 m || 
|-id=073 bgcolor=#fefefe
| 194073 ||  || — || September 16, 2001 || Socorro || LINEAR || — || align=right | 1.4 km || 
|-id=074 bgcolor=#fefefe
| 194074 ||  || — || September 16, 2001 || Socorro || LINEAR || V || align=right | 1.0 km || 
|-id=075 bgcolor=#fefefe
| 194075 ||  || — || September 16, 2001 || Socorro || LINEAR || FLO || align=right data-sort-value="0.72" | 720 m || 
|-id=076 bgcolor=#fefefe
| 194076 ||  || — || September 17, 2001 || Socorro || LINEAR || — || align=right | 1.4 km || 
|-id=077 bgcolor=#fefefe
| 194077 ||  || — || September 17, 2001 || Socorro || LINEAR || — || align=right | 1.5 km || 
|-id=078 bgcolor=#fefefe
| 194078 ||  || — || September 17, 2001 || Socorro || LINEAR || V || align=right | 1.0 km || 
|-id=079 bgcolor=#fefefe
| 194079 ||  || — || September 17, 2001 || Socorro || LINEAR || V || align=right | 1.0 km || 
|-id=080 bgcolor=#fefefe
| 194080 ||  || — || September 17, 2001 || Socorro || LINEAR || — || align=right | 1.3 km || 
|-id=081 bgcolor=#fefefe
| 194081 ||  || — || September 17, 2001 || Socorro || LINEAR || ERI || align=right | 2.2 km || 
|-id=082 bgcolor=#fefefe
| 194082 ||  || — || September 17, 2001 || Socorro || LINEAR || V || align=right | 1.1 km || 
|-id=083 bgcolor=#fefefe
| 194083 ||  || — || September 17, 2001 || Socorro || LINEAR || — || align=right | 1.3 km || 
|-id=084 bgcolor=#fefefe
| 194084 ||  || — || September 17, 2001 || Socorro || LINEAR || — || align=right | 1.1 km || 
|-id=085 bgcolor=#fefefe
| 194085 ||  || — || September 19, 2001 || Socorro || LINEAR || — || align=right data-sort-value="0.99" | 990 m || 
|-id=086 bgcolor=#fefefe
| 194086 ||  || — || September 19, 2001 || Socorro || LINEAR || V || align=right data-sort-value="0.92" | 920 m || 
|-id=087 bgcolor=#fefefe
| 194087 ||  || — || September 19, 2001 || Socorro || LINEAR || NYS || align=right | 1.0 km || 
|-id=088 bgcolor=#fefefe
| 194088 ||  || — || September 16, 2001 || Socorro || LINEAR || — || align=right | 1.4 km || 
|-id=089 bgcolor=#fefefe
| 194089 ||  || — || September 16, 2001 || Socorro || LINEAR || — || align=right | 1.3 km || 
|-id=090 bgcolor=#fefefe
| 194090 ||  || — || September 16, 2001 || Socorro || LINEAR || — || align=right | 2.0 km || 
|-id=091 bgcolor=#fefefe
| 194091 ||  || — || September 19, 2001 || Socorro || LINEAR || — || align=right data-sort-value="0.84" | 840 m || 
|-id=092 bgcolor=#fefefe
| 194092 ||  || — || September 19, 2001 || Socorro || LINEAR || — || align=right | 1.0 km || 
|-id=093 bgcolor=#fefefe
| 194093 ||  || — || September 19, 2001 || Socorro || LINEAR || — || align=right data-sort-value="0.90" | 900 m || 
|-id=094 bgcolor=#fefefe
| 194094 ||  || — || September 19, 2001 || Socorro || LINEAR || — || align=right | 1.5 km || 
|-id=095 bgcolor=#fefefe
| 194095 ||  || — || September 19, 2001 || Socorro || LINEAR || FLO || align=right | 1.1 km || 
|-id=096 bgcolor=#fefefe
| 194096 ||  || — || September 19, 2001 || Socorro || LINEAR || — || align=right | 1.2 km || 
|-id=097 bgcolor=#fefefe
| 194097 ||  || — || September 19, 2001 || Socorro || LINEAR || — || align=right | 1.2 km || 
|-id=098 bgcolor=#fefefe
| 194098 ||  || — || September 19, 2001 || Socorro || LINEAR || NYS || align=right data-sort-value="0.86" | 860 m || 
|-id=099 bgcolor=#fefefe
| 194099 ||  || — || September 19, 2001 || Socorro || LINEAR || — || align=right | 1.1 km || 
|-id=100 bgcolor=#fefefe
| 194100 ||  || — || September 19, 2001 || Socorro || LINEAR || — || align=right | 1.2 km || 
|}

194101–194200 

|-bgcolor=#fefefe
| 194101 ||  || — || September 19, 2001 || Socorro || LINEAR || — || align=right data-sort-value="0.75" | 750 m || 
|-id=102 bgcolor=#fefefe
| 194102 ||  || — || September 19, 2001 || Socorro || LINEAR || — || align=right data-sort-value="0.88" | 880 m || 
|-id=103 bgcolor=#fefefe
| 194103 ||  || — || September 19, 2001 || Socorro || LINEAR || — || align=right | 1.2 km || 
|-id=104 bgcolor=#fefefe
| 194104 ||  || — || September 19, 2001 || Socorro || LINEAR || V || align=right data-sort-value="0.92" | 920 m || 
|-id=105 bgcolor=#fefefe
| 194105 ||  || — || September 19, 2001 || Socorro || LINEAR || — || align=right data-sort-value="0.99" | 990 m || 
|-id=106 bgcolor=#fefefe
| 194106 ||  || — || September 19, 2001 || Socorro || LINEAR || FLO || align=right | 1.0 km || 
|-id=107 bgcolor=#fefefe
| 194107 ||  || — || September 19, 2001 || Socorro || LINEAR || — || align=right | 1.1 km || 
|-id=108 bgcolor=#fefefe
| 194108 ||  || — || September 19, 2001 || Socorro || LINEAR || NYS || align=right data-sort-value="0.92" | 920 m || 
|-id=109 bgcolor=#fefefe
| 194109 ||  || — || September 19, 2001 || Socorro || LINEAR || — || align=right | 1.3 km || 
|-id=110 bgcolor=#fefefe
| 194110 ||  || — || September 19, 2001 || Socorro || LINEAR || — || align=right | 1.2 km || 
|-id=111 bgcolor=#fefefe
| 194111 ||  || — || September 19, 2001 || Socorro || LINEAR || — || align=right data-sort-value="0.75" | 750 m || 
|-id=112 bgcolor=#fefefe
| 194112 ||  || — || September 19, 2001 || Socorro || LINEAR || — || align=right | 1.2 km || 
|-id=113 bgcolor=#fefefe
| 194113 ||  || — || September 19, 2001 || Socorro || LINEAR || V || align=right | 1.00 km || 
|-id=114 bgcolor=#fefefe
| 194114 ||  || — || September 19, 2001 || Socorro || LINEAR || — || align=right | 1.4 km || 
|-id=115 bgcolor=#fefefe
| 194115 ||  || — || September 19, 2001 || Socorro || LINEAR || NYS || align=right | 2.3 km || 
|-id=116 bgcolor=#fefefe
| 194116 ||  || — || September 19, 2001 || Socorro || LINEAR || NYS || align=right | 1.0 km || 
|-id=117 bgcolor=#fefefe
| 194117 ||  || — || September 19, 2001 || Socorro || LINEAR || — || align=right | 1.00 km || 
|-id=118 bgcolor=#fefefe
| 194118 ||  || — || September 19, 2001 || Socorro || LINEAR || MAS || align=right | 1.1 km || 
|-id=119 bgcolor=#d6d6d6
| 194119 ||  || — || September 20, 2001 || Socorro || LINEAR || EOS || align=right | 3.2 km || 
|-id=120 bgcolor=#fefefe
| 194120 ||  || — || September 20, 2001 || Socorro || LINEAR || — || align=right | 1.0 km || 
|-id=121 bgcolor=#fefefe
| 194121 ||  || — || September 20, 2001 || Socorro || LINEAR || V || align=right | 1.4 km || 
|-id=122 bgcolor=#fefefe
| 194122 ||  || — || September 24, 2001 || Socorro || LINEAR || PHO || align=right | 2.2 km || 
|-id=123 bgcolor=#fefefe
| 194123 ||  || — || September 24, 2001 || Socorro || LINEAR || PHO || align=right | 2.8 km || 
|-id=124 bgcolor=#fefefe
| 194124 ||  || — || September 25, 2001 || Emerald Lane || L. Ball || — || align=right | 1.3 km || 
|-id=125 bgcolor=#fefefe
| 194125 ||  || — || September 25, 2001 || Desert Eagle || W. K. Y. Yeung || — || align=right | 1.4 km || 
|-id=126 bgcolor=#FFC2E0
| 194126 ||  || — || September 26, 2001 || Anderson Mesa || LONEOS || AMO +1km || align=right data-sort-value="0.97" | 970 m || 
|-id=127 bgcolor=#fefefe
| 194127 ||  || — || September 21, 2001 || Anderson Mesa || LONEOS || FLO || align=right | 1.1 km || 
|-id=128 bgcolor=#fefefe
| 194128 ||  || — || September 21, 2001 || Anderson Mesa || LONEOS || — || align=right | 1.4 km || 
|-id=129 bgcolor=#fefefe
| 194129 ||  || — || September 22, 2001 || Kitt Peak || Spacewatch || V || align=right | 1.1 km || 
|-id=130 bgcolor=#fefefe
| 194130 ||  || — || September 19, 2001 || Socorro || LINEAR || — || align=right | 1.2 km || 
|-id=131 bgcolor=#d6d6d6
| 194131 ||  || — || September 20, 2001 || Socorro || LINEAR || 7:4 || align=right | 5.8 km || 
|-id=132 bgcolor=#fefefe
| 194132 ||  || — || September 20, 2001 || Socorro || LINEAR || — || align=right | 1.0 km || 
|-id=133 bgcolor=#fefefe
| 194133 ||  || — || September 20, 2001 || Socorro || LINEAR || FLO || align=right data-sort-value="0.74" | 740 m || 
|-id=134 bgcolor=#fefefe
| 194134 ||  || — || September 21, 2001 || Socorro || LINEAR || — || align=right | 1.2 km || 
|-id=135 bgcolor=#fefefe
| 194135 ||  || — || September 22, 2001 || Socorro || LINEAR || V || align=right | 1.3 km || 
|-id=136 bgcolor=#fefefe
| 194136 ||  || — || September 25, 2001 || Socorro || LINEAR || — || align=right | 3.0 km || 
|-id=137 bgcolor=#fefefe
| 194137 ||  || — || September 25, 2001 || Socorro || LINEAR || PHO || align=right | 3.4 km || 
|-id=138 bgcolor=#fefefe
| 194138 ||  || — || September 21, 2001 || Socorro || LINEAR || — || align=right data-sort-value="0.89" | 890 m || 
|-id=139 bgcolor=#fefefe
| 194139 ||  || — || September 25, 2001 || Socorro || LINEAR || V || align=right | 1.1 km || 
|-id=140 bgcolor=#fefefe
| 194140 ||  || — || September 25, 2001 || Socorro || LINEAR || — || align=right | 1.5 km || 
|-id=141 bgcolor=#fefefe
| 194141 ||  || — || September 26, 2001 || Socorro || LINEAR || V || align=right | 1.1 km || 
|-id=142 bgcolor=#d6d6d6
| 194142 ||  || — || September 16, 2001 || Socorro || LINEAR || — || align=right | 5.2 km || 
|-id=143 bgcolor=#fefefe
| 194143 ||  || — || September 18, 2001 || Anderson Mesa || LONEOS || V || align=right | 1.1 km || 
|-id=144 bgcolor=#fefefe
| 194144 ||  || — || September 19, 2001 || Kitt Peak || Spacewatch || FLO || align=right data-sort-value="0.71" | 710 m || 
|-id=145 bgcolor=#fefefe
| 194145 ||  || — || September 20, 2001 || Socorro || LINEAR || — || align=right data-sort-value="0.82" | 820 m || 
|-id=146 bgcolor=#fefefe
| 194146 ||  || — || September 20, 2001 || Socorro || LINEAR || — || align=right data-sort-value="0.84" | 840 m || 
|-id=147 bgcolor=#d6d6d6
| 194147 ||  || — || September 19, 2001 || Socorro || LINEAR || 7:4 || align=right | 6.1 km || 
|-id=148 bgcolor=#fefefe
| 194148 ||  || — || September 26, 2001 || Desert Eagle || W. K. Y. Yeung || FLO || align=right data-sort-value="0.89" | 890 m || 
|-id=149 bgcolor=#fefefe
| 194149 || 2001 TJ || — || October 6, 2001 || Palomar || NEAT || — || align=right data-sort-value="0.95" | 950 m || 
|-id=150 bgcolor=#fefefe
| 194150 ||  || — || October 7, 2001 || Palomar || NEAT || V || align=right data-sort-value="0.97" | 970 m || 
|-id=151 bgcolor=#fefefe
| 194151 ||  || — || October 10, 2001 || Palomar || NEAT || FLO || align=right data-sort-value="0.98" | 980 m || 
|-id=152 bgcolor=#fefefe
| 194152 ||  || — || October 11, 2001 || Desert Eagle || W. K. Y. Yeung || — || align=right | 1.2 km || 
|-id=153 bgcolor=#fefefe
| 194153 ||  || — || October 13, 2001 || Socorro || LINEAR || — || align=right | 1.1 km || 
|-id=154 bgcolor=#fefefe
| 194154 ||  || — || October 13, 2001 || Socorro || LINEAR || — || align=right | 1.1 km || 
|-id=155 bgcolor=#fefefe
| 194155 ||  || — || October 13, 2001 || Socorro || LINEAR || — || align=right | 1.0 km || 
|-id=156 bgcolor=#fefefe
| 194156 ||  || — || October 13, 2001 || Socorro || LINEAR || — || align=right data-sort-value="0.99" | 990 m || 
|-id=157 bgcolor=#fefefe
| 194157 ||  || — || October 13, 2001 || Socorro || LINEAR || ERI || align=right | 2.9 km || 
|-id=158 bgcolor=#fefefe
| 194158 ||  || — || October 11, 2001 || Socorro || LINEAR || — || align=right | 1.3 km || 
|-id=159 bgcolor=#fefefe
| 194159 ||  || — || October 14, 2001 || Desert Eagle || W. K. Y. Yeung || — || align=right | 1.4 km || 
|-id=160 bgcolor=#fefefe
| 194160 ||  || — || October 14, 2001 || Desert Eagle || W. K. Y. Yeung || — || align=right | 1.3 km || 
|-id=161 bgcolor=#fefefe
| 194161 ||  || — || October 9, 2001 || Socorro || LINEAR || — || align=right | 1.6 km || 
|-id=162 bgcolor=#fefefe
| 194162 ||  || — || October 13, 2001 || Socorro || LINEAR || NYS || align=right data-sort-value="0.77" | 770 m || 
|-id=163 bgcolor=#fefefe
| 194163 ||  || — || October 13, 2001 || Socorro || LINEAR || FLO || align=right data-sort-value="0.89" | 890 m || 
|-id=164 bgcolor=#fefefe
| 194164 ||  || — || October 13, 2001 || Socorro || LINEAR || NYS || align=right data-sort-value="0.96" | 960 m || 
|-id=165 bgcolor=#fefefe
| 194165 ||  || — || October 14, 2001 || Socorro || LINEAR || — || align=right | 1.4 km || 
|-id=166 bgcolor=#fefefe
| 194166 ||  || — || October 14, 2001 || Socorro || LINEAR || — || align=right | 1.5 km || 
|-id=167 bgcolor=#fefefe
| 194167 ||  || — || October 14, 2001 || Socorro || LINEAR || V || align=right | 1.5 km || 
|-id=168 bgcolor=#fefefe
| 194168 ||  || — || October 14, 2001 || Socorro || LINEAR || — || align=right | 1.8 km || 
|-id=169 bgcolor=#fefefe
| 194169 ||  || — || October 14, 2001 || Socorro || LINEAR || — || align=right | 1.7 km || 
|-id=170 bgcolor=#fefefe
| 194170 ||  || — || October 14, 2001 || Socorro || LINEAR || — || align=right | 1.4 km || 
|-id=171 bgcolor=#fefefe
| 194171 ||  || — || October 14, 2001 || Socorro || LINEAR || — || align=right | 1.8 km || 
|-id=172 bgcolor=#fefefe
| 194172 ||  || — || October 14, 2001 || Socorro || LINEAR || — || align=right | 1.9 km || 
|-id=173 bgcolor=#fefefe
| 194173 ||  || — || October 14, 2001 || Socorro || LINEAR || — || align=right | 1.7 km || 
|-id=174 bgcolor=#fefefe
| 194174 ||  || — || October 13, 2001 || Socorro || LINEAR || — || align=right data-sort-value="0.99" | 990 m || 
|-id=175 bgcolor=#FA8072
| 194175 ||  || — || October 13, 2001 || Socorro || LINEAR || — || align=right | 1.0 km || 
|-id=176 bgcolor=#fefefe
| 194176 ||  || — || October 13, 2001 || Socorro || LINEAR || NYS || align=right | 1.0 km || 
|-id=177 bgcolor=#fefefe
| 194177 ||  || — || October 13, 2001 || Socorro || LINEAR || NYS || align=right | 1.0 km || 
|-id=178 bgcolor=#fefefe
| 194178 ||  || — || October 14, 2001 || Socorro || LINEAR || PHO || align=right | 1.3 km || 
|-id=179 bgcolor=#fefefe
| 194179 ||  || — || October 13, 2001 || Socorro || LINEAR || — || align=right | 1.2 km || 
|-id=180 bgcolor=#fefefe
| 194180 ||  || — || October 13, 2001 || Socorro || LINEAR || NYS || align=right data-sort-value="0.96" | 960 m || 
|-id=181 bgcolor=#fefefe
| 194181 ||  || — || October 13, 2001 || Socorro || LINEAR || — || align=right | 1.4 km || 
|-id=182 bgcolor=#fefefe
| 194182 ||  || — || October 13, 2001 || Socorro || LINEAR || NYS || align=right | 2.7 km || 
|-id=183 bgcolor=#fefefe
| 194183 ||  || — || October 13, 2001 || Socorro || LINEAR || — || align=right | 1.4 km || 
|-id=184 bgcolor=#fefefe
| 194184 ||  || — || October 13, 2001 || Socorro || LINEAR || — || align=right | 1.2 km || 
|-id=185 bgcolor=#fefefe
| 194185 ||  || — || October 13, 2001 || Socorro || LINEAR || NYS || align=right | 1.3 km || 
|-id=186 bgcolor=#fefefe
| 194186 ||  || — || October 13, 2001 || Socorro || LINEAR || NYS || align=right | 1.1 km || 
|-id=187 bgcolor=#fefefe
| 194187 ||  || — || October 13, 2001 || Socorro || LINEAR || — || align=right | 1.3 km || 
|-id=188 bgcolor=#fefefe
| 194188 ||  || — || October 13, 2001 || Socorro || LINEAR || — || align=right | 1.1 km || 
|-id=189 bgcolor=#fefefe
| 194189 ||  || — || October 13, 2001 || Socorro || LINEAR || — || align=right | 1.4 km || 
|-id=190 bgcolor=#fefefe
| 194190 ||  || — || October 13, 2001 || Socorro || LINEAR || NYS || align=right data-sort-value="0.94" | 940 m || 
|-id=191 bgcolor=#fefefe
| 194191 ||  || — || October 13, 2001 || Socorro || LINEAR || NYS || align=right data-sort-value="0.79" | 790 m || 
|-id=192 bgcolor=#fefefe
| 194192 ||  || — || October 13, 2001 || Socorro || LINEAR || ERI || align=right | 2.9 km || 
|-id=193 bgcolor=#fefefe
| 194193 ||  || — || October 14, 2001 || Socorro || LINEAR || V || align=right | 1.1 km || 
|-id=194 bgcolor=#fefefe
| 194194 ||  || — || October 14, 2001 || Socorro || LINEAR || — || align=right | 1.4 km || 
|-id=195 bgcolor=#fefefe
| 194195 ||  || — || October 14, 2001 || Socorro || LINEAR || V || align=right | 1.1 km || 
|-id=196 bgcolor=#fefefe
| 194196 ||  || — || October 14, 2001 || Socorro || LINEAR || PHO || align=right | 1.1 km || 
|-id=197 bgcolor=#fefefe
| 194197 ||  || — || October 14, 2001 || Socorro || LINEAR || — || align=right | 1.1 km || 
|-id=198 bgcolor=#fefefe
| 194198 ||  || — || October 14, 2001 || Socorro || LINEAR || — || align=right | 1.2 km || 
|-id=199 bgcolor=#fefefe
| 194199 ||  || — || October 14, 2001 || Socorro || LINEAR || FLO || align=right data-sort-value="0.71" | 710 m || 
|-id=200 bgcolor=#fefefe
| 194200 ||  || — || October 14, 2001 || Socorro || LINEAR || — || align=right | 1.3 km || 
|}

194201–194300 

|-bgcolor=#fefefe
| 194201 ||  || — || October 14, 2001 || Socorro || LINEAR || — || align=right data-sort-value="0.91" | 910 m || 
|-id=202 bgcolor=#fefefe
| 194202 ||  || — || October 14, 2001 || Socorro || LINEAR || V || align=right | 1.0 km || 
|-id=203 bgcolor=#fefefe
| 194203 ||  || — || October 14, 2001 || Socorro || LINEAR || — || align=right | 1.4 km || 
|-id=204 bgcolor=#fefefe
| 194204 ||  || — || October 14, 2001 || Socorro || LINEAR || — || align=right | 1.6 km || 
|-id=205 bgcolor=#fefefe
| 194205 ||  || — || October 14, 2001 || Socorro || LINEAR || V || align=right | 1.00 km || 
|-id=206 bgcolor=#fefefe
| 194206 ||  || — || October 14, 2001 || Socorro || LINEAR || FLO || align=right data-sort-value="0.86" | 860 m || 
|-id=207 bgcolor=#d6d6d6
| 194207 ||  || — || October 14, 2001 || Socorro || LINEAR || 3:2 || align=right | 8.5 km || 
|-id=208 bgcolor=#fefefe
| 194208 ||  || — || October 15, 2001 || Socorro || LINEAR || — || align=right | 1.0 km || 
|-id=209 bgcolor=#fefefe
| 194209 ||  || — || October 15, 2001 || Desert Eagle || W. K. Y. Yeung || NYS || align=right data-sort-value="0.91" | 910 m || 
|-id=210 bgcolor=#fefefe
| 194210 ||  || — || October 14, 2001 || Socorro || LINEAR || — || align=right | 1.1 km || 
|-id=211 bgcolor=#fefefe
| 194211 ||  || — || October 14, 2001 || Socorro || LINEAR || V || align=right data-sort-value="0.92" | 920 m || 
|-id=212 bgcolor=#FA8072
| 194212 ||  || — || October 14, 2001 || Socorro || LINEAR || — || align=right | 1.1 km || 
|-id=213 bgcolor=#fefefe
| 194213 ||  || — || October 12, 2001 || Anderson Mesa || LONEOS || PHO || align=right | 1.6 km || 
|-id=214 bgcolor=#fefefe
| 194214 ||  || — || October 12, 2001 || Haleakala || NEAT || — || align=right | 1.4 km || 
|-id=215 bgcolor=#d6d6d6
| 194215 ||  || — || October 12, 2001 || Haleakala || NEAT || — || align=right | 8.2 km || 
|-id=216 bgcolor=#fefefe
| 194216 ||  || — || October 12, 2001 || Haleakala || NEAT || V || align=right data-sort-value="0.73" | 730 m || 
|-id=217 bgcolor=#fefefe
| 194217 ||  || — || October 12, 2001 || Haleakala || NEAT || FLO || align=right | 1.2 km || 
|-id=218 bgcolor=#fefefe
| 194218 ||  || — || October 13, 2001 || Palomar || NEAT || V || align=right data-sort-value="0.93" | 930 m || 
|-id=219 bgcolor=#fefefe
| 194219 ||  || — || October 14, 2001 || Palomar || NEAT || — || align=right | 1.6 km || 
|-id=220 bgcolor=#fefefe
| 194220 ||  || — || October 10, 2001 || Palomar || NEAT || — || align=right | 1.5 km || 
|-id=221 bgcolor=#fefefe
| 194221 ||  || — || October 10, 2001 || Palomar || NEAT || FLO || align=right data-sort-value="0.88" | 880 m || 
|-id=222 bgcolor=#fefefe
| 194222 ||  || — || October 10, 2001 || Palomar || NEAT || V || align=right data-sort-value="0.78" | 780 m || 
|-id=223 bgcolor=#fefefe
| 194223 ||  || — || October 10, 2001 || Palomar || NEAT || FLO || align=right data-sort-value="0.97" | 970 m || 
|-id=224 bgcolor=#fefefe
| 194224 ||  || — || October 10, 2001 || Palomar || NEAT || FLO || align=right data-sort-value="0.89" | 890 m || 
|-id=225 bgcolor=#d6d6d6
| 194225 ||  || — || October 10, 2001 || Palomar || NEAT || 7:4 || align=right | 5.7 km || 
|-id=226 bgcolor=#fefefe
| 194226 ||  || — || October 10, 2001 || Palomar || NEAT || — || align=right | 1.3 km || 
|-id=227 bgcolor=#fefefe
| 194227 ||  || — || October 10, 2001 || Palomar || NEAT || — || align=right | 1.1 km || 
|-id=228 bgcolor=#fefefe
| 194228 ||  || — || October 10, 2001 || Palomar || NEAT || — || align=right | 1.0 km || 
|-id=229 bgcolor=#fefefe
| 194229 ||  || — || October 10, 2001 || Palomar || NEAT || V || align=right data-sort-value="0.69" | 690 m || 
|-id=230 bgcolor=#fefefe
| 194230 ||  || — || October 10, 2001 || Palomar || NEAT || V || align=right | 1.0 km || 
|-id=231 bgcolor=#fefefe
| 194231 ||  || — || October 15, 2001 || Palomar || NEAT || — || align=right | 1.4 km || 
|-id=232 bgcolor=#fefefe
| 194232 ||  || — || October 14, 2001 || Kitt Peak || Spacewatch || NYS || align=right | 1.2 km || 
|-id=233 bgcolor=#fefefe
| 194233 ||  || — || October 10, 2001 || Palomar || NEAT || — || align=right | 1.2 km || 
|-id=234 bgcolor=#fefefe
| 194234 ||  || — || October 15, 2001 || Kitt Peak || Spacewatch || — || align=right | 1.2 km || 
|-id=235 bgcolor=#fefefe
| 194235 ||  || — || October 11, 2001 || Palomar || NEAT || FLO || align=right data-sort-value="0.95" | 950 m || 
|-id=236 bgcolor=#fefefe
| 194236 ||  || — || October 11, 2001 || Palomar || NEAT || V || align=right data-sort-value="0.78" | 780 m || 
|-id=237 bgcolor=#fefefe
| 194237 ||  || — || October 14, 2001 || Socorro || LINEAR || — || align=right | 1.7 km || 
|-id=238 bgcolor=#fefefe
| 194238 ||  || — || October 14, 2001 || Socorro || LINEAR || NYS || align=right | 1.2 km || 
|-id=239 bgcolor=#fefefe
| 194239 ||  || — || October 14, 2001 || Socorro || LINEAR || — || align=right | 1.4 km || 
|-id=240 bgcolor=#fefefe
| 194240 ||  || — || October 14, 2001 || Socorro || LINEAR || V || align=right data-sort-value="0.92" | 920 m || 
|-id=241 bgcolor=#fefefe
| 194241 ||  || — || October 14, 2001 || Socorro || LINEAR || — || align=right | 1.9 km || 
|-id=242 bgcolor=#fefefe
| 194242 ||  || — || October 14, 2001 || Socorro || LINEAR || — || align=right | 1.2 km || 
|-id=243 bgcolor=#fefefe
| 194243 ||  || — || October 14, 2001 || Socorro || LINEAR || — || align=right | 1.3 km || 
|-id=244 bgcolor=#fefefe
| 194244 ||  || — || October 14, 2001 || Socorro || LINEAR || — || align=right | 1.2 km || 
|-id=245 bgcolor=#fefefe
| 194245 ||  || — || October 14, 2001 || Socorro || LINEAR || FLO || align=right | 1.1 km || 
|-id=246 bgcolor=#fefefe
| 194246 ||  || — || October 14, 2001 || Socorro || LINEAR || FLO || align=right | 1.2 km || 
|-id=247 bgcolor=#fefefe
| 194247 ||  || — || October 15, 2001 || Palomar || NEAT || — || align=right | 1.4 km || 
|-id=248 bgcolor=#fefefe
| 194248 ||  || — || October 11, 2001 || Socorro || LINEAR || V || align=right | 1.4 km || 
|-id=249 bgcolor=#fefefe
| 194249 ||  || — || October 11, 2001 || Socorro || LINEAR || FLO || align=right data-sort-value="0.97" | 970 m || 
|-id=250 bgcolor=#fefefe
| 194250 ||  || — || October 11, 2001 || Socorro || LINEAR || — || align=right | 1.9 km || 
|-id=251 bgcolor=#fefefe
| 194251 ||  || — || October 11, 2001 || Socorro || LINEAR || — || align=right | 1.3 km || 
|-id=252 bgcolor=#fefefe
| 194252 ||  || — || October 11, 2001 || Socorro || LINEAR || — || align=right | 1.6 km || 
|-id=253 bgcolor=#fefefe
| 194253 ||  || — || October 13, 2001 || Anderson Mesa || LONEOS || V || align=right | 1.1 km || 
|-id=254 bgcolor=#fefefe
| 194254 ||  || — || October 14, 2001 || Socorro || LINEAR || — || align=right | 1.2 km || 
|-id=255 bgcolor=#fefefe
| 194255 ||  || — || October 15, 2001 || Socorro || LINEAR || FLO || align=right data-sort-value="0.87" | 870 m || 
|-id=256 bgcolor=#fefefe
| 194256 ||  || — || October 15, 2001 || Palomar || NEAT || — || align=right | 1.5 km || 
|-id=257 bgcolor=#fefefe
| 194257 ||  || — || October 15, 2001 || Kitt Peak || Spacewatch || — || align=right data-sort-value="0.90" | 900 m || 
|-id=258 bgcolor=#fefefe
| 194258 ||  || — || October 15, 2001 || Palomar || NEAT || — || align=right | 1.1 km || 
|-id=259 bgcolor=#fefefe
| 194259 ||  || — || October 10, 2001 || Palomar || NEAT || — || align=right | 2.6 km || 
|-id=260 bgcolor=#fefefe
| 194260 ||  || — || October 10, 2001 || Palomar || NEAT || NYS || align=right data-sort-value="0.86" | 860 m || 
|-id=261 bgcolor=#fefefe
| 194261 ||  || — || October 14, 2001 || Apache Point || SDSS || — || align=right | 1.1 km || 
|-id=262 bgcolor=#fefefe
| 194262 Nové Zámky ||  ||  || October 10, 2001 || Palomar || NEAT || — || align=right | 1.1 km || 
|-id=263 bgcolor=#FA8072
| 194263 || 2001 UL || — || October 16, 2001 || Socorro || LINEAR || PHO || align=right | 1.5 km || 
|-id=264 bgcolor=#FA8072
| 194264 || 2001 UY || — || October 17, 2001 || Socorro || LINEAR || — || align=right | 1.6 km || 
|-id=265 bgcolor=#fefefe
| 194265 ||  || — || October 17, 2001 || Desert Eagle || W. K. Y. Yeung || — || align=right | 1.1 km || 
|-id=266 bgcolor=#fefefe
| 194266 ||  || — || October 17, 2001 || Socorro || LINEAR || PHO || align=right | 1.7 km || 
|-id=267 bgcolor=#fefefe
| 194267 ||  || — || October 16, 2001 || Socorro || LINEAR || FLO || align=right data-sort-value="0.93" | 930 m || 
|-id=268 bgcolor=#FFC2E0
| 194268 ||  || — || October 16, 2001 || Socorro || LINEAR || APO +1kmPHA || align=right | 1.2 km || 
|-id=269 bgcolor=#fefefe
| 194269 ||  || — || October 17, 2001 || Socorro || LINEAR || — || align=right | 1.4 km || 
|-id=270 bgcolor=#fefefe
| 194270 ||  || — || October 21, 2001 || Desert Eagle || W. K. Y. Yeung || V || align=right | 1.0 km || 
|-id=271 bgcolor=#fefefe
| 194271 ||  || — || October 24, 2001 || Desert Eagle || W. K. Y. Yeung || V || align=right | 1.0 km || 
|-id=272 bgcolor=#fefefe
| 194272 ||  || — || October 24, 2001 || Desert Eagle || W. K. Y. Yeung || — || align=right | 1.4 km || 
|-id=273 bgcolor=#fefefe
| 194273 ||  || — || October 24, 2001 || Desert Eagle || W. K. Y. Yeung || — || align=right | 1.1 km || 
|-id=274 bgcolor=#fefefe
| 194274 ||  || — || October 25, 2001 || Eskridge || G. Hug || V || align=right | 1.4 km || 
|-id=275 bgcolor=#fefefe
| 194275 ||  || — || October 17, 2001 || Socorro || LINEAR || — || align=right | 1.8 km || 
|-id=276 bgcolor=#fefefe
| 194276 ||  || — || October 18, 2001 || Socorro || LINEAR || — || align=right | 1.4 km || 
|-id=277 bgcolor=#fefefe
| 194277 ||  || — || October 16, 2001 || Socorro || LINEAR || — || align=right data-sort-value="0.96" | 960 m || 
|-id=278 bgcolor=#fefefe
| 194278 ||  || — || October 16, 2001 || Socorro || LINEAR || ERI || align=right | 1.8 km || 
|-id=279 bgcolor=#fefefe
| 194279 ||  || — || October 16, 2001 || Socorro || LINEAR || FLO || align=right | 1.2 km || 
|-id=280 bgcolor=#fefefe
| 194280 ||  || — || October 16, 2001 || Socorro || LINEAR || — || align=right | 1.1 km || 
|-id=281 bgcolor=#fefefe
| 194281 ||  || — || October 16, 2001 || Socorro || LINEAR || — || align=right | 1.5 km || 
|-id=282 bgcolor=#fefefe
| 194282 ||  || — || October 17, 2001 || Socorro || LINEAR || — || align=right | 1.5 km || 
|-id=283 bgcolor=#fefefe
| 194283 ||  || — || October 17, 2001 || Socorro || LINEAR || — || align=right | 1.8 km || 
|-id=284 bgcolor=#fefefe
| 194284 ||  || — || October 17, 2001 || Socorro || LINEAR || NYS || align=right | 1.1 km || 
|-id=285 bgcolor=#fefefe
| 194285 ||  || — || October 17, 2001 || Socorro || LINEAR || — || align=right | 1.0 km || 
|-id=286 bgcolor=#fefefe
| 194286 ||  || — || October 17, 2001 || Socorro || LINEAR || NYS || align=right data-sort-value="0.89" | 890 m || 
|-id=287 bgcolor=#fefefe
| 194287 ||  || — || October 17, 2001 || Socorro || LINEAR || — || align=right | 1.3 km || 
|-id=288 bgcolor=#fefefe
| 194288 ||  || — || October 17, 2001 || Socorro || LINEAR || — || align=right | 1.6 km || 
|-id=289 bgcolor=#fefefe
| 194289 ||  || — || October 17, 2001 || Socorro || LINEAR || NYS || align=right data-sort-value="0.90" | 900 m || 
|-id=290 bgcolor=#fefefe
| 194290 ||  || — || October 17, 2001 || Socorro || LINEAR || — || align=right | 1.2 km || 
|-id=291 bgcolor=#fefefe
| 194291 ||  || — || October 17, 2001 || Socorro || LINEAR || — || align=right | 3.8 km || 
|-id=292 bgcolor=#fefefe
| 194292 ||  || — || October 16, 2001 || Socorro || LINEAR || NYS || align=right | 1.0 km || 
|-id=293 bgcolor=#fefefe
| 194293 ||  || — || October 17, 2001 || Socorro || LINEAR || — || align=right | 1.2 km || 
|-id=294 bgcolor=#fefefe
| 194294 ||  || — || October 17, 2001 || Socorro || LINEAR || V || align=right | 1.1 km || 
|-id=295 bgcolor=#fefefe
| 194295 ||  || — || October 17, 2001 || Socorro || LINEAR || V || align=right data-sort-value="0.87" | 870 m || 
|-id=296 bgcolor=#fefefe
| 194296 ||  || — || October 17, 2001 || Socorro || LINEAR || FLO || align=right data-sort-value="0.91" | 910 m || 
|-id=297 bgcolor=#fefefe
| 194297 ||  || — || October 17, 2001 || Socorro || LINEAR || — || align=right | 1.0 km || 
|-id=298 bgcolor=#fefefe
| 194298 ||  || — || October 17, 2001 || Socorro || LINEAR || NYS || align=right data-sort-value="0.99" | 990 m || 
|-id=299 bgcolor=#fefefe
| 194299 ||  || — || October 18, 2001 || Socorro || LINEAR || — || align=right | 1.1 km || 
|-id=300 bgcolor=#fefefe
| 194300 ||  || — || October 18, 2001 || Socorro || LINEAR || — || align=right | 1.5 km || 
|}

194301–194400 

|-bgcolor=#fefefe
| 194301 ||  || — || October 18, 2001 || Socorro || LINEAR || — || align=right | 1.4 km || 
|-id=302 bgcolor=#fefefe
| 194302 ||  || — || October 18, 2001 || Socorro || LINEAR || ERI || align=right | 3.2 km || 
|-id=303 bgcolor=#fefefe
| 194303 ||  || — || October 20, 2001 || Socorro || LINEAR || FLO || align=right | 1.0 km || 
|-id=304 bgcolor=#fefefe
| 194304 ||  || — || October 20, 2001 || Kitt Peak || Spacewatch || FLO || align=right | 1.4 km || 
|-id=305 bgcolor=#fefefe
| 194305 ||  || — || October 17, 2001 || Socorro || LINEAR || — || align=right | 1.1 km || 
|-id=306 bgcolor=#fefefe
| 194306 ||  || — || October 17, 2001 || Socorro || LINEAR || — || align=right | 1.0 km || 
|-id=307 bgcolor=#fefefe
| 194307 ||  || — || October 20, 2001 || Socorro || LINEAR || NYS || align=right data-sort-value="0.90" | 900 m || 
|-id=308 bgcolor=#fefefe
| 194308 ||  || — || October 20, 2001 || Socorro || LINEAR || FLO || align=right data-sort-value="0.93" | 930 m || 
|-id=309 bgcolor=#fefefe
| 194309 ||  || — || October 16, 2001 || Kitt Peak || Spacewatch || NYS || align=right data-sort-value="0.75" | 750 m || 
|-id=310 bgcolor=#fefefe
| 194310 ||  || — || October 18, 2001 || Kitt Peak || Spacewatch || CLA || align=right | 2.4 km || 
|-id=311 bgcolor=#fefefe
| 194311 ||  || — || October 25, 2001 || Socorro || LINEAR || PHO || align=right | 1.6 km || 
|-id=312 bgcolor=#fefefe
| 194312 ||  || — || October 18, 2001 || Palomar || NEAT || NYS || align=right data-sort-value="0.83" | 830 m || 
|-id=313 bgcolor=#fefefe
| 194313 ||  || — || October 19, 2001 || Palomar || NEAT || — || align=right | 1.0 km || 
|-id=314 bgcolor=#fefefe
| 194314 ||  || — || October 19, 2001 || Palomar || NEAT || — || align=right | 3.4 km || 
|-id=315 bgcolor=#fefefe
| 194315 ||  || — || October 17, 2001 || Socorro || LINEAR || — || align=right data-sort-value="0.98" | 980 m || 
|-id=316 bgcolor=#fefefe
| 194316 ||  || — || October 21, 2001 || Socorro || LINEAR || NYS || align=right | 1.0 km || 
|-id=317 bgcolor=#fefefe
| 194317 ||  || — || October 21, 2001 || Socorro || LINEAR || — || align=right data-sort-value="0.93" | 930 m || 
|-id=318 bgcolor=#fefefe
| 194318 ||  || — || October 22, 2001 || Socorro || LINEAR || — || align=right | 1.6 km || 
|-id=319 bgcolor=#fefefe
| 194319 ||  || — || October 22, 2001 || Socorro || LINEAR || NYS || align=right data-sort-value="0.80" | 800 m || 
|-id=320 bgcolor=#fefefe
| 194320 ||  || — || October 22, 2001 || Socorro || LINEAR || NYS || align=right | 1.2 km || 
|-id=321 bgcolor=#fefefe
| 194321 ||  || — || October 22, 2001 || Socorro || LINEAR || — || align=right | 1.2 km || 
|-id=322 bgcolor=#fefefe
| 194322 ||  || — || October 22, 2001 || Socorro || LINEAR || NYS || align=right data-sort-value="0.92" | 920 m || 
|-id=323 bgcolor=#fefefe
| 194323 ||  || — || October 22, 2001 || Socorro || LINEAR || — || align=right | 1.4 km || 
|-id=324 bgcolor=#fefefe
| 194324 ||  || — || October 22, 2001 || Socorro || LINEAR || NYS || align=right | 1.0 km || 
|-id=325 bgcolor=#fefefe
| 194325 ||  || — || October 22, 2001 || Socorro || LINEAR || V || align=right data-sort-value="0.75" | 750 m || 
|-id=326 bgcolor=#fefefe
| 194326 ||  || — || October 22, 2001 || Socorro || LINEAR || V || align=right | 1.2 km || 
|-id=327 bgcolor=#fefefe
| 194327 ||  || — || October 22, 2001 || Socorro || LINEAR || NYS || align=right | 1.1 km || 
|-id=328 bgcolor=#fefefe
| 194328 ||  || — || October 20, 2001 || Socorro || LINEAR || NYS || align=right | 1.6 km || 
|-id=329 bgcolor=#fefefe
| 194329 ||  || — || October 20, 2001 || Socorro || LINEAR || — || align=right | 1.2 km || 
|-id=330 bgcolor=#fefefe
| 194330 ||  || — || October 21, 2001 || Socorro || LINEAR || — || align=right | 1.1 km || 
|-id=331 bgcolor=#fefefe
| 194331 ||  || — || October 21, 2001 || Socorro || LINEAR || — || align=right data-sort-value="0.81" | 810 m || 
|-id=332 bgcolor=#fefefe
| 194332 ||  || — || October 21, 2001 || Socorro || LINEAR || MAS || align=right data-sort-value="0.98" | 980 m || 
|-id=333 bgcolor=#fefefe
| 194333 ||  || — || October 21, 2001 || Socorro || LINEAR || — || align=right | 1.4 km || 
|-id=334 bgcolor=#fefefe
| 194334 ||  || — || October 22, 2001 || Socorro || LINEAR || — || align=right | 1.5 km || 
|-id=335 bgcolor=#fefefe
| 194335 ||  || — || October 23, 2001 || Socorro || LINEAR || FLO || align=right | 1.0 km || 
|-id=336 bgcolor=#fefefe
| 194336 ||  || — || October 23, 2001 || Socorro || LINEAR || — || align=right | 1.2 km || 
|-id=337 bgcolor=#fefefe
| 194337 ||  || — || October 23, 2001 || Socorro || LINEAR || — || align=right | 1.1 km || 
|-id=338 bgcolor=#fefefe
| 194338 ||  || — || October 23, 2001 || Socorro || LINEAR || V || align=right data-sort-value="0.93" | 930 m || 
|-id=339 bgcolor=#fefefe
| 194339 ||  || — || October 23, 2001 || Socorro || LINEAR || V || align=right data-sort-value="0.89" | 890 m || 
|-id=340 bgcolor=#fefefe
| 194340 ||  || — || October 23, 2001 || Socorro || LINEAR || V || align=right data-sort-value="0.97" | 970 m || 
|-id=341 bgcolor=#fefefe
| 194341 ||  || — || October 23, 2001 || Socorro || LINEAR || NYS || align=right data-sort-value="0.99" | 990 m || 
|-id=342 bgcolor=#fefefe
| 194342 ||  || — || October 23, 2001 || Socorro || LINEAR || — || align=right | 1.2 km || 
|-id=343 bgcolor=#fefefe
| 194343 ||  || — || October 23, 2001 || Socorro || LINEAR || — || align=right | 1.0 km || 
|-id=344 bgcolor=#fefefe
| 194344 ||  || — || October 23, 2001 || Socorro || LINEAR || — || align=right | 1.8 km || 
|-id=345 bgcolor=#fefefe
| 194345 ||  || — || October 23, 2001 || Socorro || LINEAR || V || align=right | 1.1 km || 
|-id=346 bgcolor=#fefefe
| 194346 ||  || — || October 23, 2001 || Socorro || LINEAR || NYS || align=right data-sort-value="0.88" | 880 m || 
|-id=347 bgcolor=#fefefe
| 194347 ||  || — || October 23, 2001 || Socorro || LINEAR || — || align=right data-sort-value="0.94" | 940 m || 
|-id=348 bgcolor=#fefefe
| 194348 ||  || — || October 23, 2001 || Socorro || LINEAR || — || align=right | 1.2 km || 
|-id=349 bgcolor=#fefefe
| 194349 ||  || — || October 23, 2001 || Socorro || LINEAR || FLO || align=right | 1.1 km || 
|-id=350 bgcolor=#fefefe
| 194350 ||  || — || October 23, 2001 || Socorro || LINEAR || NYS || align=right data-sort-value="0.91" | 910 m || 
|-id=351 bgcolor=#fefefe
| 194351 ||  || — || October 23, 2001 || Socorro || LINEAR || EUT || align=right | 1.2 km || 
|-id=352 bgcolor=#fefefe
| 194352 ||  || — || October 23, 2001 || Socorro || LINEAR || — || align=right | 1.1 km || 
|-id=353 bgcolor=#fefefe
| 194353 ||  || — || October 23, 2001 || Socorro || LINEAR || — || align=right | 1.2 km || 
|-id=354 bgcolor=#fefefe
| 194354 ||  || — || October 19, 2001 || Palomar || NEAT || — || align=right | 1.2 km || 
|-id=355 bgcolor=#fefefe
| 194355 ||  || — || October 23, 2001 || Palomar || NEAT || FLO || align=right | 1.0 km || 
|-id=356 bgcolor=#fefefe
| 194356 ||  || — || October 21, 2001 || Socorro || LINEAR || V || align=right | 1.0 km || 
|-id=357 bgcolor=#fefefe
| 194357 ||  || — || October 21, 2001 || Socorro || LINEAR || NYS || align=right data-sort-value="0.97" | 970 m || 
|-id=358 bgcolor=#fefefe
| 194358 ||  || — || October 21, 2001 || Socorro || LINEAR || — || align=right | 1.0 km || 
|-id=359 bgcolor=#fefefe
| 194359 ||  || — || October 21, 2001 || Socorro || LINEAR || NYS || align=right | 1.1 km || 
|-id=360 bgcolor=#fefefe
| 194360 ||  || — || October 18, 2001 || Palomar || NEAT || — || align=right | 1.0 km || 
|-id=361 bgcolor=#fefefe
| 194361 ||  || — || October 24, 2001 || Palomar || NEAT || NYS || align=right data-sort-value="0.76" | 760 m || 
|-id=362 bgcolor=#fefefe
| 194362 ||  || — || October 19, 2001 || Kitt Peak || Spacewatch || — || align=right | 1.1 km || 
|-id=363 bgcolor=#fefefe
| 194363 ||  || — || October 21, 2001 || Socorro || LINEAR || FLO || align=right | 1.4 km || 
|-id=364 bgcolor=#fefefe
| 194364 ||  || — || October 23, 2001 || Socorro || LINEAR || NYS || align=right data-sort-value="0.88" | 880 m || 
|-id=365 bgcolor=#fefefe
| 194365 ||  || — || October 23, 2001 || Palomar || NEAT || FLO || align=right | 1.1 km || 
|-id=366 bgcolor=#fefefe
| 194366 ||  || — || October 16, 2001 || Socorro || LINEAR || — || align=right | 1.1 km || 
|-id=367 bgcolor=#fefefe
| 194367 ||  || — || October 17, 2001 || Palomar || NEAT || — || align=right data-sort-value="0.98" | 980 m || 
|-id=368 bgcolor=#fefefe
| 194368 ||  || — || October 18, 2001 || Palomar || NEAT || — || align=right | 1.0 km || 
|-id=369 bgcolor=#fefefe
| 194369 ||  || — || October 18, 2001 || Palomar || NEAT || FLO || align=right data-sort-value="0.78" | 780 m || 
|-id=370 bgcolor=#fefefe
| 194370 ||  || — || October 18, 2001 || Kitt Peak || Spacewatch || V || align=right | 1.1 km || 
|-id=371 bgcolor=#fefefe
| 194371 ||  || — || October 18, 2001 || Kitt Peak || Spacewatch || — || align=right | 1.3 km || 
|-id=372 bgcolor=#fefefe
| 194372 ||  || — || October 19, 2001 || Palomar || NEAT || — || align=right data-sort-value="0.91" | 910 m || 
|-id=373 bgcolor=#fefefe
| 194373 ||  || — || October 19, 2001 || Palomar || NEAT || — || align=right | 1.3 km || 
|-id=374 bgcolor=#fefefe
| 194374 ||  || — || October 21, 2001 || Socorro || LINEAR || — || align=right | 1.1 km || 
|-id=375 bgcolor=#fefefe
| 194375 ||  || — || October 21, 2001 || Socorro || LINEAR || FLO || align=right data-sort-value="0.91" | 910 m || 
|-id=376 bgcolor=#fefefe
| 194376 ||  || — || October 21, 2001 || Kitt Peak || Spacewatch || — || align=right data-sort-value="0.99" | 990 m || 
|-id=377 bgcolor=#fefefe
| 194377 ||  || — || October 23, 2001 || Socorro || LINEAR || NYS || align=right data-sort-value="0.85" | 850 m || 
|-id=378 bgcolor=#fefefe
| 194378 ||  || — || October 23, 2001 || Kitt Peak || Spacewatch || NYS || align=right | 1.1 km || 
|-id=379 bgcolor=#fefefe
| 194379 ||  || — || October 24, 2001 || Socorro || LINEAR || — || align=right | 2.3 km || 
|-id=380 bgcolor=#fefefe
| 194380 ||  || — || October 23, 2001 || Socorro || LINEAR || V || align=right data-sort-value="0.85" | 850 m || 
|-id=381 bgcolor=#fefefe
| 194381 ||  || — || November 8, 2001 || Bisei SG Center || BATTeRS || NYS || align=right | 1.4 km || 
|-id=382 bgcolor=#fefefe
| 194382 ||  || — || November 10, 2001 || Badlands || R. Dyvig || NYS || align=right | 1.4 km || 
|-id=383 bgcolor=#fefefe
| 194383 ||  || — || November 9, 2001 || Kitt Peak || Spacewatch || V || align=right data-sort-value="0.77" | 770 m || 
|-id=384 bgcolor=#d6d6d6
| 194384 ||  || — || November 9, 2001 || Kitt Peak || Spacewatch || SHU3:2 || align=right | 7.0 km || 
|-id=385 bgcolor=#fefefe
| 194385 ||  || — || November 11, 2001 || Kitt Peak || Spacewatch || — || align=right | 3.1 km || 
|-id=386 bgcolor=#FFC2E0
| 194386 ||  || — || November 10, 2001 || Socorro || LINEAR || APO +1km || align=right data-sort-value="0.92" | 920 m || 
|-id=387 bgcolor=#fefefe
| 194387 ||  || — || November 9, 2001 || Socorro || LINEAR || — || align=right | 1.3 km || 
|-id=388 bgcolor=#fefefe
| 194388 ||  || — || November 9, 2001 || Socorro || LINEAR || V || align=right | 1.1 km || 
|-id=389 bgcolor=#fefefe
| 194389 ||  || — || November 9, 2001 || Socorro || LINEAR || NYS || align=right | 2.0 km || 
|-id=390 bgcolor=#fefefe
| 194390 ||  || — || November 10, 2001 || Socorro || LINEAR || FLO || align=right | 1.3 km || 
|-id=391 bgcolor=#fefefe
| 194391 ||  || — || November 10, 2001 || Socorro || LINEAR || — || align=right | 1.4 km || 
|-id=392 bgcolor=#fefefe
| 194392 ||  || — || November 10, 2001 || Socorro || LINEAR || — || align=right | 1.4 km || 
|-id=393 bgcolor=#fefefe
| 194393 ||  || — || November 9, 2001 || Socorro || LINEAR || — || align=right | 1.3 km || 
|-id=394 bgcolor=#fefefe
| 194394 ||  || — || November 9, 2001 || Socorro || LINEAR || NYS || align=right data-sort-value="0.88" | 880 m || 
|-id=395 bgcolor=#fefefe
| 194395 ||  || — || November 9, 2001 || Socorro || LINEAR || FLO || align=right | 1.1 km || 
|-id=396 bgcolor=#fefefe
| 194396 ||  || — || November 9, 2001 || Socorro || LINEAR || V || align=right | 1.3 km || 
|-id=397 bgcolor=#fefefe
| 194397 ||  || — || November 9, 2001 || Socorro || LINEAR || MAS || align=right data-sort-value="0.94" | 940 m || 
|-id=398 bgcolor=#fefefe
| 194398 ||  || — || November 9, 2001 || Socorro || LINEAR || — || align=right | 1.5 km || 
|-id=399 bgcolor=#d6d6d6
| 194399 ||  || — || November 9, 2001 || Socorro || LINEAR || 3:2 || align=right | 8.5 km || 
|-id=400 bgcolor=#fefefe
| 194400 ||  || — || November 9, 2001 || Socorro || LINEAR || MAS || align=right | 1.4 km || 
|}

194401–194500 

|-bgcolor=#fefefe
| 194401 ||  || — || November 9, 2001 || Socorro || LINEAR || NYS || align=right | 1.1 km || 
|-id=402 bgcolor=#fefefe
| 194402 ||  || — || November 9, 2001 || Socorro || LINEAR || — || align=right | 1.7 km || 
|-id=403 bgcolor=#fefefe
| 194403 ||  || — || November 9, 2001 || Socorro || LINEAR || NYS || align=right | 1.2 km || 
|-id=404 bgcolor=#fefefe
| 194404 ||  || — || November 9, 2001 || Socorro || LINEAR || — || align=right | 1.4 km || 
|-id=405 bgcolor=#fefefe
| 194405 ||  || — || November 9, 2001 || Socorro || LINEAR || NYS || align=right | 1.1 km || 
|-id=406 bgcolor=#fefefe
| 194406 ||  || — || November 9, 2001 || Socorro || LINEAR || — || align=right | 1.6 km || 
|-id=407 bgcolor=#fefefe
| 194407 ||  || — || November 9, 2001 || Socorro || LINEAR || — || align=right | 1.2 km || 
|-id=408 bgcolor=#fefefe
| 194408 ||  || — || November 9, 2001 || Socorro || LINEAR || — || align=right | 1.6 km || 
|-id=409 bgcolor=#fefefe
| 194409 ||  || — || November 9, 2001 || Socorro || LINEAR || — || align=right | 1.4 km || 
|-id=410 bgcolor=#fefefe
| 194410 ||  || — || November 9, 2001 || Socorro || LINEAR || — || align=right data-sort-value="0.94" | 940 m || 
|-id=411 bgcolor=#fefefe
| 194411 ||  || — || November 9, 2001 || Socorro || LINEAR || FLO || align=right | 1.2 km || 
|-id=412 bgcolor=#fefefe
| 194412 ||  || — || November 9, 2001 || Socorro || LINEAR || — || align=right | 3.5 km || 
|-id=413 bgcolor=#fefefe
| 194413 ||  || — || November 9, 2001 || Socorro || LINEAR || — || align=right | 1.8 km || 
|-id=414 bgcolor=#fefefe
| 194414 ||  || — || November 10, 2001 || Socorro || LINEAR || — || align=right | 3.7 km || 
|-id=415 bgcolor=#fefefe
| 194415 ||  || — || November 10, 2001 || Socorro || LINEAR || V || align=right | 1.1 km || 
|-id=416 bgcolor=#fefefe
| 194416 ||  || — || November 10, 2001 || Socorro || LINEAR || V || align=right data-sort-value="0.95" | 950 m || 
|-id=417 bgcolor=#fefefe
| 194417 ||  || — || November 10, 2001 || Socorro || LINEAR || FLO || align=right data-sort-value="0.75" | 750 m || 
|-id=418 bgcolor=#fefefe
| 194418 ||  || — || November 10, 2001 || Socorro || LINEAR || NYS || align=right data-sort-value="0.92" | 920 m || 
|-id=419 bgcolor=#fefefe
| 194419 ||  || — || November 10, 2001 || Socorro || LINEAR || FLO || align=right | 1.3 km || 
|-id=420 bgcolor=#fefefe
| 194420 ||  || — || November 10, 2001 || Socorro || LINEAR || — || align=right | 1.4 km || 
|-id=421 bgcolor=#fefefe
| 194421 ||  || — || November 10, 2001 || Socorro || LINEAR || ERI || align=right | 2.6 km || 
|-id=422 bgcolor=#fefefe
| 194422 ||  || — || November 10, 2001 || Socorro || LINEAR || V || align=right data-sort-value="0.83" | 830 m || 
|-id=423 bgcolor=#fefefe
| 194423 ||  || — || November 10, 2001 || Socorro || LINEAR || FLO || align=right data-sort-value="0.99" | 990 m || 
|-id=424 bgcolor=#fefefe
| 194424 ||  || — || November 10, 2001 || Socorro || LINEAR || — || align=right | 1.4 km || 
|-id=425 bgcolor=#fefefe
| 194425 ||  || — || November 10, 2001 || Socorro || LINEAR || — || align=right | 1.4 km || 
|-id=426 bgcolor=#fefefe
| 194426 ||  || — || November 10, 2001 || Socorro || LINEAR || NYS || align=right | 1.2 km || 
|-id=427 bgcolor=#fefefe
| 194427 ||  || — || November 11, 2001 || Socorro || LINEAR || — || align=right data-sort-value="0.94" | 940 m || 
|-id=428 bgcolor=#fefefe
| 194428 ||  || — || November 11, 2001 || Socorro || LINEAR || V || align=right data-sort-value="0.99" | 990 m || 
|-id=429 bgcolor=#fefefe
| 194429 ||  || — || November 10, 2001 || Ondřejov || P. Pravec, P. Kušnirák || — || align=right | 1.3 km || 
|-id=430 bgcolor=#fefefe
| 194430 ||  || — || November 12, 2001 || Haleakala || NEAT || — || align=right | 1.2 km || 
|-id=431 bgcolor=#fefefe
| 194431 ||  || — || November 10, 2001 || Palomar || NEAT || — || align=right | 1.4 km || 
|-id=432 bgcolor=#fefefe
| 194432 ||  || — || November 10, 2001 || Socorro || LINEAR || — || align=right | 1.4 km || 
|-id=433 bgcolor=#fefefe
| 194433 ||  || — || November 10, 2001 || Socorro || LINEAR || FLO || align=right data-sort-value="0.85" | 850 m || 
|-id=434 bgcolor=#fefefe
| 194434 ||  || — || November 10, 2001 || Socorro || LINEAR || NYS || align=right data-sort-value="0.86" | 860 m || 
|-id=435 bgcolor=#fefefe
| 194435 ||  || — || November 12, 2001 || Socorro || LINEAR || — || align=right | 1.4 km || 
|-id=436 bgcolor=#fefefe
| 194436 ||  || — || November 15, 2001 || Palomar || NEAT || ERI || align=right | 2.7 km || 
|-id=437 bgcolor=#fefefe
| 194437 ||  || — || November 15, 2001 || Palomar || NEAT || NYS || align=right data-sort-value="0.90" | 900 m || 
|-id=438 bgcolor=#fefefe
| 194438 ||  || — || November 12, 2001 || Socorro || LINEAR || NYS || align=right | 2.4 km || 
|-id=439 bgcolor=#fefefe
| 194439 ||  || — || November 12, 2001 || Socorro || LINEAR || V || align=right data-sort-value="0.95" | 950 m || 
|-id=440 bgcolor=#fefefe
| 194440 ||  || — || November 12, 2001 || Socorro || LINEAR || — || align=right | 1.8 km || 
|-id=441 bgcolor=#fefefe
| 194441 ||  || — || November 12, 2001 || Socorro || LINEAR || NYS || align=right data-sort-value="0.72" | 720 m || 
|-id=442 bgcolor=#fefefe
| 194442 ||  || — || November 12, 2001 || Socorro || LINEAR || MAS || align=right data-sort-value="0.90" | 900 m || 
|-id=443 bgcolor=#fefefe
| 194443 ||  || — || November 12, 2001 || Socorro || LINEAR || V || align=right | 1.2 km || 
|-id=444 bgcolor=#fefefe
| 194444 ||  || — || November 12, 2001 || Socorro || LINEAR || — || align=right | 1.3 km || 
|-id=445 bgcolor=#fefefe
| 194445 ||  || — || November 12, 2001 || Socorro || LINEAR || — || align=right | 1.2 km || 
|-id=446 bgcolor=#fefefe
| 194446 ||  || — || November 12, 2001 || Socorro || LINEAR || NYS || align=right data-sort-value="0.76" | 760 m || 
|-id=447 bgcolor=#fefefe
| 194447 ||  || — || November 12, 2001 || Socorro || LINEAR || MAS || align=right | 1.2 km || 
|-id=448 bgcolor=#E9E9E9
| 194448 ||  || — || November 12, 2001 || Socorro || LINEAR || — || align=right | 1.8 km || 
|-id=449 bgcolor=#fefefe
| 194449 ||  || — || November 12, 2001 || Socorro || LINEAR || NYS || align=right data-sort-value="0.80" | 800 m || 
|-id=450 bgcolor=#fefefe
| 194450 ||  || — || November 12, 2001 || Socorro || LINEAR || FLO || align=right | 1.0 km || 
|-id=451 bgcolor=#fefefe
| 194451 ||  || — || November 12, 2001 || Socorro || LINEAR || NYS || align=right | 1.4 km || 
|-id=452 bgcolor=#fefefe
| 194452 ||  || — || November 12, 2001 || Socorro || LINEAR || NYS || align=right data-sort-value="0.88" | 880 m || 
|-id=453 bgcolor=#fefefe
| 194453 ||  || — || November 12, 2001 || Socorro || LINEAR || ERI || align=right | 2.0 km || 
|-id=454 bgcolor=#fefefe
| 194454 ||  || — || November 12, 2001 || Socorro || LINEAR || — || align=right | 1.6 km || 
|-id=455 bgcolor=#fefefe
| 194455 ||  || — || November 12, 2001 || Socorro || LINEAR || — || align=right | 1.6 km || 
|-id=456 bgcolor=#fefefe
| 194456 ||  || — || November 12, 2001 || Socorro || LINEAR || — || align=right | 1.5 km || 
|-id=457 bgcolor=#fefefe
| 194457 ||  || — || November 9, 2001 || Palomar || NEAT || — || align=right | 1.1 km || 
|-id=458 bgcolor=#fefefe
| 194458 ||  || — || November 11, 2001 || Socorro || LINEAR || V || align=right | 1.0 km || 
|-id=459 bgcolor=#FA8072
| 194459 ||  || — || November 20, 2001 || Anderson Mesa || LONEOS || — || align=right | 1.4 km || 
|-id=460 bgcolor=#fefefe
| 194460 ||  || — || November 17, 2001 || Socorro || LINEAR || — || align=right | 1.1 km || 
|-id=461 bgcolor=#fefefe
| 194461 ||  || — || November 16, 2001 || Kitt Peak || Spacewatch || — || align=right | 1.1 km || 
|-id=462 bgcolor=#fefefe
| 194462 ||  || — || November 17, 2001 || Kitt Peak || Spacewatch || MAS || align=right data-sort-value="0.78" | 780 m || 
|-id=463 bgcolor=#fefefe
| 194463 ||  || — || November 17, 2001 || Socorro || LINEAR || — || align=right | 1.5 km || 
|-id=464 bgcolor=#fefefe
| 194464 ||  || — || November 17, 2001 || Socorro || LINEAR || — || align=right | 1.5 km || 
|-id=465 bgcolor=#fefefe
| 194465 ||  || — || November 17, 2001 || Socorro || LINEAR || — || align=right | 1.1 km || 
|-id=466 bgcolor=#fefefe
| 194466 ||  || — || November 17, 2001 || Socorro || LINEAR || — || align=right | 1.2 km || 
|-id=467 bgcolor=#fefefe
| 194467 ||  || — || November 17, 2001 || Socorro || LINEAR || NYS || align=right | 2.2 km || 
|-id=468 bgcolor=#fefefe
| 194468 ||  || — || November 17, 2001 || Socorro || LINEAR || — || align=right | 1.0 km || 
|-id=469 bgcolor=#fefefe
| 194469 ||  || — || November 17, 2001 || Socorro || LINEAR || — || align=right | 2.8 km || 
|-id=470 bgcolor=#fefefe
| 194470 ||  || — || November 17, 2001 || Anderson Mesa || LONEOS || — || align=right | 1.5 km || 
|-id=471 bgcolor=#fefefe
| 194471 ||  || — || November 17, 2001 || Socorro || LINEAR || NYS || align=right data-sort-value="0.95" | 950 m || 
|-id=472 bgcolor=#fefefe
| 194472 ||  || — || November 17, 2001 || Socorro || LINEAR || NYS || align=right data-sort-value="0.83" | 830 m || 
|-id=473 bgcolor=#fefefe
| 194473 ||  || — || November 18, 2001 || Socorro || LINEAR || — || align=right | 1.1 km || 
|-id=474 bgcolor=#fefefe
| 194474 ||  || — || November 17, 2001 || Socorro || LINEAR || — || align=right | 1.4 km || 
|-id=475 bgcolor=#fefefe
| 194475 ||  || — || November 17, 2001 || Socorro || LINEAR || — || align=right | 1.4 km || 
|-id=476 bgcolor=#fefefe
| 194476 ||  || — || November 17, 2001 || Socorro || LINEAR || — || align=right | 1.3 km || 
|-id=477 bgcolor=#fefefe
| 194477 ||  || — || November 17, 2001 || Socorro || LINEAR || FLO || align=right data-sort-value="0.97" | 970 m || 
|-id=478 bgcolor=#fefefe
| 194478 ||  || — || November 17, 2001 || Socorro || LINEAR || — || align=right | 1.0 km || 
|-id=479 bgcolor=#fefefe
| 194479 ||  || — || November 17, 2001 || Socorro || LINEAR || — || align=right | 1.2 km || 
|-id=480 bgcolor=#fefefe
| 194480 ||  || — || November 17, 2001 || Socorro || LINEAR || — || align=right | 1.2 km || 
|-id=481 bgcolor=#fefefe
| 194481 ||  || — || November 17, 2001 || Socorro || LINEAR || — || align=right | 1.1 km || 
|-id=482 bgcolor=#fefefe
| 194482 ||  || — || November 17, 2001 || Socorro || LINEAR || — || align=right | 1.6 km || 
|-id=483 bgcolor=#fefefe
| 194483 ||  || — || November 19, 2001 || Socorro || LINEAR || — || align=right | 1.1 km || 
|-id=484 bgcolor=#fefefe
| 194484 ||  || — || November 19, 2001 || Socorro || LINEAR || — || align=right data-sort-value="0.94" | 940 m || 
|-id=485 bgcolor=#fefefe
| 194485 ||  || — || November 19, 2001 || Socorro || LINEAR || V || align=right data-sort-value="0.97" | 970 m || 
|-id=486 bgcolor=#fefefe
| 194486 ||  || — || November 17, 2001 || Anderson Mesa || LONEOS || — || align=right | 1.8 km || 
|-id=487 bgcolor=#fefefe
| 194487 ||  || — || November 19, 2001 || Socorro || LINEAR || V || align=right | 1.7 km || 
|-id=488 bgcolor=#fefefe
| 194488 ||  || — || November 19, 2001 || Socorro || LINEAR || V || align=right | 1.2 km || 
|-id=489 bgcolor=#fefefe
| 194489 ||  || — || November 19, 2001 || Socorro || LINEAR || — || align=right | 1.1 km || 
|-id=490 bgcolor=#fefefe
| 194490 ||  || — || November 19, 2001 || Socorro || LINEAR || — || align=right | 2.4 km || 
|-id=491 bgcolor=#fefefe
| 194491 ||  || — || November 19, 2001 || Socorro || LINEAR || — || align=right data-sort-value="0.97" | 970 m || 
|-id=492 bgcolor=#fefefe
| 194492 ||  || — || November 19, 2001 || Socorro || LINEAR || NYS || align=right data-sort-value="0.87" | 870 m || 
|-id=493 bgcolor=#fefefe
| 194493 ||  || — || November 20, 2001 || Socorro || LINEAR || — || align=right data-sort-value="0.91" | 910 m || 
|-id=494 bgcolor=#fefefe
| 194494 ||  || — || November 20, 2001 || Socorro || LINEAR || NYS || align=right data-sort-value="0.60" | 600 m || 
|-id=495 bgcolor=#fefefe
| 194495 ||  || — || November 20, 2001 || Socorro || LINEAR || MAS || align=right | 1.2 km || 
|-id=496 bgcolor=#fefefe
| 194496 ||  || — || November 20, 2001 || Socorro || LINEAR || — || align=right data-sort-value="0.94" | 940 m || 
|-id=497 bgcolor=#fefefe
| 194497 ||  || — || November 20, 2001 || Socorro || LINEAR || — || align=right | 1.1 km || 
|-id=498 bgcolor=#fefefe
| 194498 ||  || — || November 20, 2001 || Socorro || LINEAR || MAS || align=right | 1.5 km || 
|-id=499 bgcolor=#fefefe
| 194499 ||  || — || November 20, 2001 || Socorro || LINEAR || MAS || align=right data-sort-value="0.97" | 970 m || 
|-id=500 bgcolor=#fefefe
| 194500 ||  || — || November 20, 2001 || Socorro || LINEAR || — || align=right | 1.5 km || 
|}

194501–194600 

|-bgcolor=#d6d6d6
| 194501 ||  || — || November 20, 2001 || Socorro || LINEAR || 3:2 || align=right | 5.0 km || 
|-id=502 bgcolor=#fefefe
| 194502 ||  || — || November 19, 2001 || Socorro || LINEAR || FLO || align=right | 1.0 km || 
|-id=503 bgcolor=#fefefe
| 194503 ||  || — || November 19, 2001 || Socorro || LINEAR || NYS || align=right data-sort-value="0.88" | 880 m || 
|-id=504 bgcolor=#fefefe
| 194504 ||  || — || November 19, 2001 || Socorro || LINEAR || — || align=right | 1.4 km || 
|-id=505 bgcolor=#fefefe
| 194505 ||  || — || November 19, 2001 || Socorro || LINEAR || NYS || align=right data-sort-value="0.90" | 900 m || 
|-id=506 bgcolor=#fefefe
| 194506 ||  || — || November 21, 2001 || Socorro || LINEAR || V || align=right data-sort-value="0.92" | 920 m || 
|-id=507 bgcolor=#fefefe
| 194507 ||  || — || November 21, 2001 || Socorro || LINEAR || — || align=right | 1.1 km || 
|-id=508 bgcolor=#fefefe
| 194508 ||  || — || November 17, 2001 || Socorro || LINEAR || — || align=right data-sort-value="0.91" | 910 m || 
|-id=509 bgcolor=#fefefe
| 194509 ||  || — || November 21, 2001 || Socorro || LINEAR || MAS || align=right data-sort-value="0.92" | 920 m || 
|-id=510 bgcolor=#fefefe
| 194510 ||  || — || November 16, 2001 || Kitt Peak || Spacewatch || — || align=right data-sort-value="0.89" | 890 m || 
|-id=511 bgcolor=#fefefe
| 194511 ||  || — || November 18, 2001 || Kitt Peak || Spacewatch || — || align=right | 1.1 km || 
|-id=512 bgcolor=#d6d6d6
| 194512 || 2001 XR || — || December 7, 2001 || Eskridge || G. Hug || 3:2 || align=right | 6.2 km || 
|-id=513 bgcolor=#FA8072
| 194513 ||  || — || December 8, 2001 || Socorro || LINEAR || — || align=right | 2.9 km || 
|-id=514 bgcolor=#fefefe
| 194514 ||  || — || December 9, 2001 || Kitt Peak || Spacewatch || NYS || align=right data-sort-value="0.76" | 760 m || 
|-id=515 bgcolor=#FA8072
| 194515 ||  || — || December 9, 2001 || Socorro || LINEAR || — || align=right | 2.3 km || 
|-id=516 bgcolor=#fefefe
| 194516 ||  || — || December 8, 2001 || Socorro || LINEAR || MAS || align=right data-sort-value="0.98" | 980 m || 
|-id=517 bgcolor=#fefefe
| 194517 ||  || — || December 9, 2001 || Socorro || LINEAR || FLO || align=right | 2.1 km || 
|-id=518 bgcolor=#fefefe
| 194518 ||  || — || December 9, 2001 || Socorro || LINEAR || V || align=right | 1.1 km || 
|-id=519 bgcolor=#fefefe
| 194519 ||  || — || December 7, 2001 || Socorro || LINEAR || V || align=right | 1.1 km || 
|-id=520 bgcolor=#fefefe
| 194520 ||  || — || December 9, 2001 || Socorro || LINEAR || V || align=right | 1.1 km || 
|-id=521 bgcolor=#fefefe
| 194521 ||  || — || December 9, 2001 || Socorro || LINEAR || — || align=right | 1.5 km || 
|-id=522 bgcolor=#fefefe
| 194522 ||  || — || December 9, 2001 || Socorro || LINEAR || — || align=right | 1.5 km || 
|-id=523 bgcolor=#fefefe
| 194523 ||  || — || December 9, 2001 || Socorro || LINEAR || — || align=right | 1.9 km || 
|-id=524 bgcolor=#fefefe
| 194524 ||  || — || December 9, 2001 || Socorro || LINEAR || — || align=right | 1.6 km || 
|-id=525 bgcolor=#fefefe
| 194525 ||  || — || December 9, 2001 || Socorro || LINEAR || FLO || align=right | 1.2 km || 
|-id=526 bgcolor=#fefefe
| 194526 ||  || — || December 9, 2001 || Socorro || LINEAR || — || align=right | 1.4 km || 
|-id=527 bgcolor=#fefefe
| 194527 ||  || — || December 9, 2001 || Socorro || LINEAR || V || align=right | 1.6 km || 
|-id=528 bgcolor=#fefefe
| 194528 ||  || — || December 10, 2001 || Socorro || LINEAR || — || align=right | 1.8 km || 
|-id=529 bgcolor=#fefefe
| 194529 ||  || — || December 10, 2001 || Kitt Peak || Spacewatch || V || align=right data-sort-value="0.96" | 960 m || 
|-id=530 bgcolor=#fefefe
| 194530 ||  || — || December 9, 2001 || Socorro || LINEAR || — || align=right | 1.8 km || 
|-id=531 bgcolor=#fefefe
| 194531 ||  || — || December 9, 2001 || Socorro || LINEAR || V || align=right | 1.0 km || 
|-id=532 bgcolor=#fefefe
| 194532 ||  || — || December 9, 2001 || Socorro || LINEAR || — || align=right | 1.5 km || 
|-id=533 bgcolor=#fefefe
| 194533 ||  || — || December 9, 2001 || Socorro || LINEAR || — || align=right | 2.0 km || 
|-id=534 bgcolor=#fefefe
| 194534 ||  || — || December 9, 2001 || Socorro || LINEAR || — || align=right | 1.6 km || 
|-id=535 bgcolor=#fefefe
| 194535 ||  || — || December 9, 2001 || Socorro || LINEAR || — || align=right | 1.8 km || 
|-id=536 bgcolor=#fefefe
| 194536 ||  || — || December 9, 2001 || Socorro || LINEAR || — || align=right | 3.0 km || 
|-id=537 bgcolor=#fefefe
| 194537 ||  || — || December 10, 2001 || Socorro || LINEAR || MAS || align=right | 1.3 km || 
|-id=538 bgcolor=#fefefe
| 194538 ||  || — || December 10, 2001 || Socorro || LINEAR || NYS || align=right | 3.0 km || 
|-id=539 bgcolor=#fefefe
| 194539 ||  || — || December 10, 2001 || Socorro || LINEAR || — || align=right | 1.2 km || 
|-id=540 bgcolor=#fefefe
| 194540 ||  || — || December 10, 2001 || Socorro || LINEAR || — || align=right | 1.1 km || 
|-id=541 bgcolor=#fefefe
| 194541 ||  || — || December 11, 2001 || Socorro || LINEAR || — || align=right | 2.9 km || 
|-id=542 bgcolor=#fefefe
| 194542 ||  || — || December 10, 2001 || Socorro || LINEAR || V || align=right | 1.0 km || 
|-id=543 bgcolor=#fefefe
| 194543 ||  || — || December 10, 2001 || Socorro || LINEAR || — || align=right | 1.7 km || 
|-id=544 bgcolor=#fefefe
| 194544 ||  || — || December 10, 2001 || Socorro || LINEAR || NYS || align=right | 1.1 km || 
|-id=545 bgcolor=#fefefe
| 194545 ||  || — || December 10, 2001 || Socorro || LINEAR || NYS || align=right | 1.2 km || 
|-id=546 bgcolor=#fefefe
| 194546 ||  || — || December 10, 2001 || Socorro || LINEAR || — || align=right | 1.2 km || 
|-id=547 bgcolor=#fefefe
| 194547 ||  || — || December 10, 2001 || Socorro || LINEAR || MAS || align=right | 1.4 km || 
|-id=548 bgcolor=#fefefe
| 194548 ||  || — || December 11, 2001 || Socorro || LINEAR || — || align=right | 1.6 km || 
|-id=549 bgcolor=#fefefe
| 194549 ||  || — || December 11, 2001 || Socorro || LINEAR || — || align=right | 2.7 km || 
|-id=550 bgcolor=#fefefe
| 194550 ||  || — || December 11, 2001 || Socorro || LINEAR || NYS || align=right | 1.1 km || 
|-id=551 bgcolor=#fefefe
| 194551 ||  || — || December 11, 2001 || Socorro || LINEAR || NYS || align=right data-sort-value="0.88" | 880 m || 
|-id=552 bgcolor=#fefefe
| 194552 ||  || — || December 11, 2001 || Socorro || LINEAR || NYS || align=right data-sort-value="0.86" | 860 m || 
|-id=553 bgcolor=#fefefe
| 194553 ||  || — || December 11, 2001 || Socorro || LINEAR || — || align=right | 1.2 km || 
|-id=554 bgcolor=#fefefe
| 194554 ||  || — || December 11, 2001 || Socorro || LINEAR || — || align=right | 1.2 km || 
|-id=555 bgcolor=#fefefe
| 194555 ||  || — || December 11, 2001 || Socorro || LINEAR || MAS || align=right | 1.0 km || 
|-id=556 bgcolor=#fefefe
| 194556 ||  || — || December 11, 2001 || Socorro || LINEAR || NYS || align=right data-sort-value="0.90" | 900 m || 
|-id=557 bgcolor=#fefefe
| 194557 ||  || — || December 11, 2001 || Socorro || LINEAR || NYS || align=right data-sort-value="0.81" | 810 m || 
|-id=558 bgcolor=#fefefe
| 194558 ||  || — || December 11, 2001 || Socorro || LINEAR || NYS || align=right | 1.2 km || 
|-id=559 bgcolor=#fefefe
| 194559 ||  || — || December 11, 2001 || Socorro || LINEAR || — || align=right | 1.2 km || 
|-id=560 bgcolor=#fefefe
| 194560 ||  || — || December 11, 2001 || Socorro || LINEAR || — || align=right | 1.4 km || 
|-id=561 bgcolor=#fefefe
| 194561 ||  || — || December 14, 2001 || Desert Eagle || W. K. Y. Yeung || ERI || align=right | 2.6 km || 
|-id=562 bgcolor=#fefefe
| 194562 ||  || — || December 10, 2001 || Socorro || LINEAR || MAS || align=right | 1.2 km || 
|-id=563 bgcolor=#fefefe
| 194563 ||  || — || December 10, 2001 || Socorro || LINEAR || — || align=right | 1.5 km || 
|-id=564 bgcolor=#fefefe
| 194564 ||  || — || December 10, 2001 || Socorro || LINEAR || MAS || align=right data-sort-value="0.71" | 710 m || 
|-id=565 bgcolor=#fefefe
| 194565 ||  || — || December 10, 2001 || Socorro || LINEAR || NYS || align=right data-sort-value="0.85" | 850 m || 
|-id=566 bgcolor=#fefefe
| 194566 ||  || — || December 10, 2001 || Socorro || LINEAR || NYS || align=right | 1.1 km || 
|-id=567 bgcolor=#fefefe
| 194567 ||  || — || December 10, 2001 || Socorro || LINEAR || MAS || align=right | 1.0 km || 
|-id=568 bgcolor=#fefefe
| 194568 ||  || — || December 10, 2001 || Socorro || LINEAR || ERI || align=right | 2.2 km || 
|-id=569 bgcolor=#fefefe
| 194569 ||  || — || December 10, 2001 || Socorro || LINEAR || NYS || align=right data-sort-value="0.91" | 910 m || 
|-id=570 bgcolor=#fefefe
| 194570 ||  || — || December 10, 2001 || Socorro || LINEAR || V || align=right data-sort-value="0.96" | 960 m || 
|-id=571 bgcolor=#fefefe
| 194571 ||  || — || December 10, 2001 || Socorro || LINEAR || NYS || align=right | 1.2 km || 
|-id=572 bgcolor=#fefefe
| 194572 ||  || — || December 10, 2001 || Socorro || LINEAR || V || align=right | 1.2 km || 
|-id=573 bgcolor=#fefefe
| 194573 ||  || — || December 10, 2001 || Socorro || LINEAR || FLO || align=right | 1.1 km || 
|-id=574 bgcolor=#fefefe
| 194574 ||  || — || December 10, 2001 || Socorro || LINEAR || NYS || align=right data-sort-value="0.85" | 850 m || 
|-id=575 bgcolor=#fefefe
| 194575 ||  || — || December 10, 2001 || Socorro || LINEAR || MAS || align=right | 1.1 km || 
|-id=576 bgcolor=#fefefe
| 194576 ||  || — || December 10, 2001 || Socorro || LINEAR || — || align=right | 1.3 km || 
|-id=577 bgcolor=#fefefe
| 194577 ||  || — || December 10, 2001 || Socorro || LINEAR || NYS || align=right | 3.1 km || 
|-id=578 bgcolor=#fefefe
| 194578 ||  || — || December 10, 2001 || Socorro || LINEAR || V || align=right | 1.1 km || 
|-id=579 bgcolor=#fefefe
| 194579 ||  || — || December 10, 2001 || Socorro || LINEAR || — || align=right | 1.8 km || 
|-id=580 bgcolor=#fefefe
| 194580 ||  || — || December 14, 2001 || Socorro || LINEAR || — || align=right | 1.9 km || 
|-id=581 bgcolor=#fefefe
| 194581 ||  || — || December 15, 2001 || Socorro || LINEAR || — || align=right | 6.2 km || 
|-id=582 bgcolor=#fefefe
| 194582 ||  || — || December 10, 2001 || Socorro || LINEAR || CLA || align=right | 2.1 km || 
|-id=583 bgcolor=#fefefe
| 194583 ||  || — || December 10, 2001 || Socorro || LINEAR || NYS || align=right | 2.9 km || 
|-id=584 bgcolor=#fefefe
| 194584 ||  || — || December 10, 2001 || Socorro || LINEAR || — || align=right | 1.3 km || 
|-id=585 bgcolor=#fefefe
| 194585 ||  || — || December 10, 2001 || Socorro || LINEAR || — || align=right | 1.5 km || 
|-id=586 bgcolor=#fefefe
| 194586 ||  || — || December 11, 2001 || Socorro || LINEAR || — || align=right data-sort-value="0.87" | 870 m || 
|-id=587 bgcolor=#fefefe
| 194587 ||  || — || December 11, 2001 || Socorro || LINEAR || — || align=right | 1.5 km || 
|-id=588 bgcolor=#fefefe
| 194588 ||  || — || December 11, 2001 || Socorro || LINEAR || V || align=right | 1.0 km || 
|-id=589 bgcolor=#fefefe
| 194589 ||  || — || December 13, 2001 || Socorro || LINEAR || — || align=right | 1.3 km || 
|-id=590 bgcolor=#fefefe
| 194590 ||  || — || December 13, 2001 || Socorro || LINEAR || V || align=right | 1.3 km || 
|-id=591 bgcolor=#fefefe
| 194591 ||  || — || December 13, 2001 || Socorro || LINEAR || — || align=right | 1.3 km || 
|-id=592 bgcolor=#fefefe
| 194592 ||  || — || December 13, 2001 || Socorro || LINEAR || — || align=right | 1.6 km || 
|-id=593 bgcolor=#fefefe
| 194593 ||  || — || December 13, 2001 || Socorro || LINEAR || — || align=right | 1.9 km || 
|-id=594 bgcolor=#fefefe
| 194594 ||  || — || December 13, 2001 || Socorro || LINEAR || — || align=right | 2.2 km || 
|-id=595 bgcolor=#fefefe
| 194595 ||  || — || December 13, 2001 || Socorro || LINEAR || — || align=right | 1.7 km || 
|-id=596 bgcolor=#fefefe
| 194596 ||  || — || December 14, 2001 || Socorro || LINEAR || NYS || align=right | 2.8 km || 
|-id=597 bgcolor=#fefefe
| 194597 ||  || — || December 14, 2001 || Socorro || LINEAR || — || align=right | 1.0 km || 
|-id=598 bgcolor=#fefefe
| 194598 ||  || — || December 14, 2001 || Socorro || LINEAR || — || align=right | 1.3 km || 
|-id=599 bgcolor=#fefefe
| 194599 ||  || — || December 14, 2001 || Socorro || LINEAR || MAS || align=right | 1.0 km || 
|-id=600 bgcolor=#fefefe
| 194600 ||  || — || December 14, 2001 || Socorro || LINEAR || MAS || align=right | 1.2 km || 
|}

194601–194700 

|-bgcolor=#fefefe
| 194601 ||  || — || December 14, 2001 || Socorro || LINEAR || NYS || align=right data-sort-value="0.85" | 850 m || 
|-id=602 bgcolor=#fefefe
| 194602 ||  || — || December 14, 2001 || Socorro || LINEAR || EUT || align=right | 1.2 km || 
|-id=603 bgcolor=#fefefe
| 194603 ||  || — || December 14, 2001 || Socorro || LINEAR || — || align=right | 1.0 km || 
|-id=604 bgcolor=#fefefe
| 194604 ||  || — || December 14, 2001 || Socorro || LINEAR || — || align=right | 1.3 km || 
|-id=605 bgcolor=#fefefe
| 194605 ||  || — || December 14, 2001 || Socorro || LINEAR || V || align=right data-sort-value="0.95" | 950 m || 
|-id=606 bgcolor=#fefefe
| 194606 ||  || — || December 14, 2001 || Socorro || LINEAR || — || align=right | 1.5 km || 
|-id=607 bgcolor=#fefefe
| 194607 ||  || — || December 14, 2001 || Socorro || LINEAR || MAS || align=right | 1.2 km || 
|-id=608 bgcolor=#fefefe
| 194608 ||  || — || December 14, 2001 || Socorro || LINEAR || — || align=right | 1.0 km || 
|-id=609 bgcolor=#fefefe
| 194609 ||  || — || December 14, 2001 || Socorro || LINEAR || MAS || align=right data-sort-value="0.95" | 950 m || 
|-id=610 bgcolor=#fefefe
| 194610 ||  || — || December 14, 2001 || Socorro || LINEAR || NYS || align=right data-sort-value="0.88" | 880 m || 
|-id=611 bgcolor=#fefefe
| 194611 ||  || — || December 14, 2001 || Socorro || LINEAR || — || align=right | 1.2 km || 
|-id=612 bgcolor=#fefefe
| 194612 ||  || — || December 14, 2001 || Socorro || LINEAR || NYS || align=right data-sort-value="0.78" | 780 m || 
|-id=613 bgcolor=#fefefe
| 194613 ||  || — || December 14, 2001 || Socorro || LINEAR || MAS || align=right data-sort-value="0.93" | 930 m || 
|-id=614 bgcolor=#fefefe
| 194614 ||  || — || December 14, 2001 || Socorro || LINEAR || EUT || align=right data-sort-value="0.90" | 900 m || 
|-id=615 bgcolor=#fefefe
| 194615 ||  || — || December 14, 2001 || Socorro || LINEAR || MAS || align=right | 1.3 km || 
|-id=616 bgcolor=#fefefe
| 194616 ||  || — || December 14, 2001 || Socorro || LINEAR || NYS || align=right data-sort-value="0.96" | 960 m || 
|-id=617 bgcolor=#fefefe
| 194617 ||  || — || December 14, 2001 || Socorro || LINEAR || NYS || align=right data-sort-value="0.82" | 820 m || 
|-id=618 bgcolor=#fefefe
| 194618 ||  || — || December 14, 2001 || Socorro || LINEAR || — || align=right | 1.1 km || 
|-id=619 bgcolor=#fefefe
| 194619 ||  || — || December 14, 2001 || Socorro || LINEAR || MAS || align=right | 1.4 km || 
|-id=620 bgcolor=#fefefe
| 194620 ||  || — || December 14, 2001 || Socorro || LINEAR || — || align=right | 1.4 km || 
|-id=621 bgcolor=#fefefe
| 194621 ||  || — || December 14, 2001 || Socorro || LINEAR || — || align=right | 1.3 km || 
|-id=622 bgcolor=#fefefe
| 194622 ||  || — || December 14, 2001 || Socorro || LINEAR || EUT || align=right | 1.1 km || 
|-id=623 bgcolor=#fefefe
| 194623 ||  || — || December 14, 2001 || Socorro || LINEAR || — || align=right | 1.1 km || 
|-id=624 bgcolor=#fefefe
| 194624 ||  || — || December 14, 2001 || Socorro || LINEAR || NYS || align=right data-sort-value="0.76" | 760 m || 
|-id=625 bgcolor=#fefefe
| 194625 ||  || — || December 14, 2001 || Socorro || LINEAR || ERI || align=right | 4.1 km || 
|-id=626 bgcolor=#fefefe
| 194626 ||  || — || December 14, 2001 || Socorro || LINEAR || MAS || align=right data-sort-value="0.94" | 940 m || 
|-id=627 bgcolor=#fefefe
| 194627 ||  || — || December 14, 2001 || Socorro || LINEAR || NYS || align=right | 1.0 km || 
|-id=628 bgcolor=#fefefe
| 194628 ||  || — || December 14, 2001 || Socorro || LINEAR || NYS || align=right | 1.1 km || 
|-id=629 bgcolor=#fefefe
| 194629 ||  || — || December 14, 2001 || Socorro || LINEAR || NYS || align=right | 1.2 km || 
|-id=630 bgcolor=#fefefe
| 194630 ||  || — || December 14, 2001 || Socorro || LINEAR || NYS || align=right | 2.3 km || 
|-id=631 bgcolor=#d6d6d6
| 194631 ||  || — || December 14, 2001 || Socorro || LINEAR || 3:2 || align=right | 6.0 km || 
|-id=632 bgcolor=#fefefe
| 194632 ||  || — || December 14, 2001 || Socorro || LINEAR || NYS || align=right data-sort-value="0.85" | 850 m || 
|-id=633 bgcolor=#fefefe
| 194633 ||  || — || December 14, 2001 || Socorro || LINEAR || MAS || align=right | 1.1 km || 
|-id=634 bgcolor=#fefefe
| 194634 ||  || — || December 14, 2001 || Socorro || LINEAR || MAS || align=right | 1.0 km || 
|-id=635 bgcolor=#fefefe
| 194635 ||  || — || December 14, 2001 || Socorro || LINEAR || NYS || align=right data-sort-value="0.95" | 950 m || 
|-id=636 bgcolor=#fefefe
| 194636 ||  || — || December 14, 2001 || Socorro || LINEAR || NYS || align=right data-sort-value="0.96" | 960 m || 
|-id=637 bgcolor=#fefefe
| 194637 ||  || — || December 14, 2001 || Socorro || LINEAR || NYS || align=right data-sort-value="0.90" | 900 m || 
|-id=638 bgcolor=#fefefe
| 194638 ||  || — || December 14, 2001 || Socorro || LINEAR || NYS || align=right | 1.9 km || 
|-id=639 bgcolor=#fefefe
| 194639 ||  || — || December 14, 2001 || Socorro || LINEAR || NYS || align=right data-sort-value="0.81" | 810 m || 
|-id=640 bgcolor=#fefefe
| 194640 ||  || — || December 14, 2001 || Socorro || LINEAR || — || align=right | 1.5 km || 
|-id=641 bgcolor=#fefefe
| 194641 ||  || — || December 14, 2001 || Socorro || LINEAR || NYS || align=right | 1.2 km || 
|-id=642 bgcolor=#fefefe
| 194642 ||  || — || December 14, 2001 || Socorro || LINEAR || NYS || align=right data-sort-value="0.65" | 650 m || 
|-id=643 bgcolor=#fefefe
| 194643 ||  || — || December 14, 2001 || Socorro || LINEAR || — || align=right | 1.1 km || 
|-id=644 bgcolor=#fefefe
| 194644 ||  || — || December 14, 2001 || Socorro || LINEAR || CLA || align=right | 3.3 km || 
|-id=645 bgcolor=#fefefe
| 194645 ||  || — || December 14, 2001 || Socorro || LINEAR || — || align=right | 1.5 km || 
|-id=646 bgcolor=#fefefe
| 194646 ||  || — || December 14, 2001 || Socorro || LINEAR || MAS || align=right | 1.1 km || 
|-id=647 bgcolor=#fefefe
| 194647 ||  || — || December 14, 2001 || Socorro || LINEAR || V || align=right | 1.2 km || 
|-id=648 bgcolor=#fefefe
| 194648 ||  || — || December 14, 2001 || Socorro || LINEAR || NYS || align=right data-sort-value="0.97" | 970 m || 
|-id=649 bgcolor=#fefefe
| 194649 ||  || — || December 14, 2001 || Socorro || LINEAR || NYS || align=right data-sort-value="0.85" | 850 m || 
|-id=650 bgcolor=#fefefe
| 194650 ||  || — || December 14, 2001 || Socorro || LINEAR || NYS || align=right data-sort-value="0.92" | 920 m || 
|-id=651 bgcolor=#fefefe
| 194651 ||  || — || December 14, 2001 || Socorro || LINEAR || — || align=right | 1.1 km || 
|-id=652 bgcolor=#fefefe
| 194652 ||  || — || December 14, 2001 || Socorro || LINEAR || — || align=right | 1.3 km || 
|-id=653 bgcolor=#fefefe
| 194653 ||  || — || December 14, 2001 || Socorro || LINEAR || — || align=right | 1.2 km || 
|-id=654 bgcolor=#fefefe
| 194654 ||  || — || December 14, 2001 || Socorro || LINEAR || ERI || align=right | 3.2 km || 
|-id=655 bgcolor=#fefefe
| 194655 ||  || — || December 14, 2001 || Socorro || LINEAR || — || align=right | 1.7 km || 
|-id=656 bgcolor=#fefefe
| 194656 ||  || — || December 14, 2001 || Socorro || LINEAR || — || align=right | 2.2 km || 
|-id=657 bgcolor=#fefefe
| 194657 ||  || — || December 14, 2001 || Socorro || LINEAR || — || align=right | 1.2 km || 
|-id=658 bgcolor=#fefefe
| 194658 ||  || — || December 14, 2001 || Socorro || LINEAR || V || align=right | 1.0 km || 
|-id=659 bgcolor=#fefefe
| 194659 ||  || — || December 14, 2001 || Socorro || LINEAR || ERI || align=right | 2.2 km || 
|-id=660 bgcolor=#fefefe
| 194660 ||  || — || December 14, 2001 || Socorro || LINEAR || — || align=right | 1.5 km || 
|-id=661 bgcolor=#fefefe
| 194661 ||  || — || December 14, 2001 || Socorro || LINEAR || MAS || align=right | 1.3 km || 
|-id=662 bgcolor=#fefefe
| 194662 ||  || — || December 14, 2001 || Socorro || LINEAR || — || align=right | 1.2 km || 
|-id=663 bgcolor=#fefefe
| 194663 ||  || — || December 14, 2001 || Socorro || LINEAR || — || align=right | 1.3 km || 
|-id=664 bgcolor=#fefefe
| 194664 ||  || — || December 14, 2001 || Socorro || LINEAR || — || align=right | 3.0 km || 
|-id=665 bgcolor=#fefefe
| 194665 ||  || — || December 14, 2001 || Socorro || LINEAR || MAS || align=right data-sort-value="0.98" | 980 m || 
|-id=666 bgcolor=#fefefe
| 194666 ||  || — || December 14, 2001 || Socorro || LINEAR || — || align=right | 1.4 km || 
|-id=667 bgcolor=#fefefe
| 194667 ||  || — || December 14, 2001 || Socorro || LINEAR || — || align=right | 1.4 km || 
|-id=668 bgcolor=#fefefe
| 194668 ||  || — || December 14, 2001 || Socorro || LINEAR || — || align=right | 1.6 km || 
|-id=669 bgcolor=#fefefe
| 194669 ||  || — || December 14, 2001 || Socorro || LINEAR || — || align=right | 1.6 km || 
|-id=670 bgcolor=#fefefe
| 194670 ||  || — || December 14, 2001 || Socorro || LINEAR || — || align=right | 1.9 km || 
|-id=671 bgcolor=#fefefe
| 194671 ||  || — || December 14, 2001 || Socorro || LINEAR || NYS || align=right | 1.1 km || 
|-id=672 bgcolor=#fefefe
| 194672 ||  || — || December 14, 2001 || Socorro || LINEAR || NYS || align=right | 2.9 km || 
|-id=673 bgcolor=#fefefe
| 194673 ||  || — || December 14, 2001 || Socorro || LINEAR || FLO || align=right | 1.3 km || 
|-id=674 bgcolor=#fefefe
| 194674 ||  || — || December 14, 2001 || Socorro || LINEAR || ERI || align=right | 2.3 km || 
|-id=675 bgcolor=#fefefe
| 194675 ||  || — || December 14, 2001 || Socorro || LINEAR || — || align=right | 1.5 km || 
|-id=676 bgcolor=#fefefe
| 194676 ||  || — || December 14, 2001 || Socorro || LINEAR || — || align=right | 2.0 km || 
|-id=677 bgcolor=#fefefe
| 194677 ||  || — || December 14, 2001 || Socorro || LINEAR || — || align=right | 1.4 km || 
|-id=678 bgcolor=#fefefe
| 194678 ||  || — || December 14, 2001 || Socorro || LINEAR || V || align=right | 1.1 km || 
|-id=679 bgcolor=#fefefe
| 194679 ||  || — || December 14, 2001 || Kitt Peak || Spacewatch || FLO || align=right | 1.1 km || 
|-id=680 bgcolor=#fefefe
| 194680 ||  || — || December 11, 2001 || Socorro || LINEAR || — || align=right | 1.2 km || 
|-id=681 bgcolor=#fefefe
| 194681 ||  || — || December 11, 2001 || Socorro || LINEAR || — || align=right | 1.2 km || 
|-id=682 bgcolor=#fefefe
| 194682 ||  || — || December 11, 2001 || Socorro || LINEAR || — || align=right | 1.8 km || 
|-id=683 bgcolor=#fefefe
| 194683 ||  || — || December 13, 2001 || Socorro || LINEAR || — || align=right | 3.3 km || 
|-id=684 bgcolor=#fefefe
| 194684 ||  || — || December 14, 2001 || Socorro || LINEAR || NYS || align=right data-sort-value="0.88" | 880 m || 
|-id=685 bgcolor=#fefefe
| 194685 ||  || — || December 14, 2001 || Socorro || LINEAR || — || align=right | 1.1 km || 
|-id=686 bgcolor=#fefefe
| 194686 ||  || — || December 15, 2001 || Socorro || LINEAR || V || align=right data-sort-value="0.94" | 940 m || 
|-id=687 bgcolor=#fefefe
| 194687 ||  || — || December 15, 2001 || Socorro || LINEAR || — || align=right data-sort-value="0.91" | 910 m || 
|-id=688 bgcolor=#fefefe
| 194688 ||  || — || December 15, 2001 || Socorro || LINEAR || — || align=right | 1.8 km || 
|-id=689 bgcolor=#fefefe
| 194689 ||  || — || December 15, 2001 || Socorro || LINEAR || — || align=right | 1.2 km || 
|-id=690 bgcolor=#fefefe
| 194690 ||  || — || December 15, 2001 || Socorro || LINEAR || — || align=right | 2.5 km || 
|-id=691 bgcolor=#fefefe
| 194691 ||  || — || December 15, 2001 || Socorro || LINEAR || NYS || align=right data-sort-value="0.95" | 950 m || 
|-id=692 bgcolor=#fefefe
| 194692 ||  || — || December 15, 2001 || Socorro || LINEAR || — || align=right | 1.2 km || 
|-id=693 bgcolor=#fefefe
| 194693 ||  || — || December 15, 2001 || Socorro || LINEAR || V || align=right | 1.1 km || 
|-id=694 bgcolor=#fefefe
| 194694 ||  || — || December 15, 2001 || Socorro || LINEAR || — || align=right data-sort-value="0.93" | 930 m || 
|-id=695 bgcolor=#fefefe
| 194695 ||  || — || December 15, 2001 || Socorro || LINEAR || NYS || align=right data-sort-value="0.99" | 990 m || 
|-id=696 bgcolor=#fefefe
| 194696 ||  || — || December 15, 2001 || Socorro || LINEAR || NYS || align=right | 1.0 km || 
|-id=697 bgcolor=#fefefe
| 194697 ||  || — || December 15, 2001 || Socorro || LINEAR || — || align=right | 1.6 km || 
|-id=698 bgcolor=#fefefe
| 194698 ||  || — || December 15, 2001 || Socorro || LINEAR || — || align=right | 1.4 km || 
|-id=699 bgcolor=#fefefe
| 194699 ||  || — || December 15, 2001 || Socorro || LINEAR || MAS || align=right data-sort-value="0.90" | 900 m || 
|-id=700 bgcolor=#fefefe
| 194700 ||  || — || December 15, 2001 || Socorro || LINEAR || NYS || align=right data-sort-value="0.97" | 970 m || 
|}

194701–194800 

|-bgcolor=#fefefe
| 194701 ||  || — || December 15, 2001 || Socorro || LINEAR || NYS || align=right data-sort-value="0.85" | 850 m || 
|-id=702 bgcolor=#fefefe
| 194702 ||  || — || December 15, 2001 || Socorro || LINEAR || — || align=right | 1.4 km || 
|-id=703 bgcolor=#fefefe
| 194703 ||  || — || December 15, 2001 || Socorro || LINEAR || — || align=right | 1.8 km || 
|-id=704 bgcolor=#fefefe
| 194704 ||  || — || December 15, 2001 || Socorro || LINEAR || MAS || align=right | 1.1 km || 
|-id=705 bgcolor=#fefefe
| 194705 ||  || — || December 15, 2001 || Socorro || LINEAR || NYS || align=right data-sort-value="0.86" | 860 m || 
|-id=706 bgcolor=#fefefe
| 194706 ||  || — || December 15, 2001 || Socorro || LINEAR || — || align=right | 1.3 km || 
|-id=707 bgcolor=#fefefe
| 194707 ||  || — || December 15, 2001 || Socorro || LINEAR || — || align=right | 1.4 km || 
|-id=708 bgcolor=#fefefe
| 194708 ||  || — || December 15, 2001 || Socorro || LINEAR || MAS || align=right | 1.5 km || 
|-id=709 bgcolor=#fefefe
| 194709 ||  || — || December 15, 2001 || Socorro || LINEAR || — || align=right | 1.4 km || 
|-id=710 bgcolor=#fefefe
| 194710 ||  || — || December 15, 2001 || Socorro || LINEAR || NYS || align=right | 1.3 km || 
|-id=711 bgcolor=#fefefe
| 194711 ||  || — || December 15, 2001 || Socorro || LINEAR || NYS || align=right | 1.3 km || 
|-id=712 bgcolor=#fefefe
| 194712 ||  || — || December 15, 2001 || Socorro || LINEAR || — || align=right | 1.7 km || 
|-id=713 bgcolor=#fefefe
| 194713 ||  || — || December 15, 2001 || Socorro || LINEAR || NYS || align=right data-sort-value="0.94" | 940 m || 
|-id=714 bgcolor=#fefefe
| 194714 ||  || — || December 15, 2001 || Socorro || LINEAR || MAS || align=right | 1.1 km || 
|-id=715 bgcolor=#fefefe
| 194715 ||  || — || December 15, 2001 || Socorro || LINEAR || V || align=right data-sort-value="0.95" | 950 m || 
|-id=716 bgcolor=#fefefe
| 194716 ||  || — || December 15, 2001 || Socorro || LINEAR || — || align=right data-sort-value="0.98" | 980 m || 
|-id=717 bgcolor=#fefefe
| 194717 ||  || — || December 15, 2001 || Socorro || LINEAR || — || align=right | 1.5 km || 
|-id=718 bgcolor=#fefefe
| 194718 ||  || — || December 15, 2001 || Socorro || LINEAR || — || align=right | 1.5 km || 
|-id=719 bgcolor=#fefefe
| 194719 ||  || — || December 15, 2001 || Socorro || LINEAR || NYS || align=right | 1.3 km || 
|-id=720 bgcolor=#fefefe
| 194720 ||  || — || December 15, 2001 || Socorro || LINEAR || — || align=right | 3.4 km || 
|-id=721 bgcolor=#E9E9E9
| 194721 ||  || — || December 14, 2001 || Kitt Peak || Spacewatch || — || align=right | 1.8 km || 
|-id=722 bgcolor=#fefefe
| 194722 ||  || — || December 14, 2001 || Socorro || LINEAR || — || align=right | 2.0 km || 
|-id=723 bgcolor=#fefefe
| 194723 ||  || — || December 14, 2001 || Socorro || LINEAR || NYS || align=right | 1.1 km || 
|-id=724 bgcolor=#d6d6d6
| 194724 ||  || — || December 7, 2001 || Palomar || NEAT || 3:2 || align=right | 7.1 km || 
|-id=725 bgcolor=#fefefe
| 194725 ||  || — || December 8, 2001 || Anderson Mesa || LONEOS || — || align=right | 1.5 km || 
|-id=726 bgcolor=#fefefe
| 194726 ||  || — || December 8, 2001 || Anderson Mesa || LONEOS || — || align=right data-sort-value="0.94" | 940 m || 
|-id=727 bgcolor=#fefefe
| 194727 ||  || — || December 9, 2001 || Anderson Mesa || LONEOS || — || align=right | 1.5 km || 
|-id=728 bgcolor=#fefefe
| 194728 ||  || — || December 14, 2001 || Kitt Peak || Spacewatch || NYS || align=right data-sort-value="0.86" | 860 m || 
|-id=729 bgcolor=#fefefe
| 194729 ||  || — || December 14, 2001 || Socorro || LINEAR || — || align=right | 1.0 km || 
|-id=730 bgcolor=#fefefe
| 194730 ||  || — || December 14, 2001 || Socorro || LINEAR || NYS || align=right | 1.0 km || 
|-id=731 bgcolor=#fefefe
| 194731 || 2001 YB || — || December 16, 2001 || Oaxaca || J. M. Roe || NYS || align=right data-sort-value="0.92" | 920 m || 
|-id=732 bgcolor=#fefefe
| 194732 ||  || — || December 19, 2001 || Fountain Hills || C. W. Juels, P. R. Holvorcem || — || align=right | 2.1 km || 
|-id=733 bgcolor=#fefefe
| 194733 ||  || — || December 17, 2001 || Cima Ekar || ADAS || — || align=right | 1.4 km || 
|-id=734 bgcolor=#fefefe
| 194734 ||  || — || December 17, 2001 || Socorro || LINEAR || — || align=right | 1.3 km || 
|-id=735 bgcolor=#fefefe
| 194735 ||  || — || December 17, 2001 || Socorro || LINEAR || — || align=right | 1.3 km || 
|-id=736 bgcolor=#fefefe
| 194736 ||  || — || December 17, 2001 || Socorro || LINEAR || — || align=right | 1.3 km || 
|-id=737 bgcolor=#fefefe
| 194737 ||  || — || December 17, 2001 || Socorro || LINEAR || MAS || align=right data-sort-value="0.92" | 920 m || 
|-id=738 bgcolor=#fefefe
| 194738 ||  || — || December 17, 2001 || Socorro || LINEAR || MAS || align=right | 1.2 km || 
|-id=739 bgcolor=#fefefe
| 194739 ||  || — || December 18, 2001 || Socorro || LINEAR || NYS || align=right data-sort-value="0.72" | 720 m || 
|-id=740 bgcolor=#fefefe
| 194740 ||  || — || December 18, 2001 || Socorro || LINEAR || — || align=right | 1.4 km || 
|-id=741 bgcolor=#d6d6d6
| 194741 ||  || — || December 18, 2001 || Socorro || LINEAR || SHU3:2 || align=right | 7.4 km || 
|-id=742 bgcolor=#d6d6d6
| 194742 ||  || — || December 18, 2001 || Socorro || LINEAR || SHU3:2 || align=right | 7.6 km || 
|-id=743 bgcolor=#d6d6d6
| 194743 ||  || — || December 18, 2001 || Socorro || LINEAR || SHU3:2 || align=right | 7.3 km || 
|-id=744 bgcolor=#fefefe
| 194744 ||  || — || December 18, 2001 || Socorro || LINEAR || NYS || align=right data-sort-value="0.74" | 740 m || 
|-id=745 bgcolor=#fefefe
| 194745 ||  || — || December 18, 2001 || Socorro || LINEAR || MAS || align=right | 1.4 km || 
|-id=746 bgcolor=#fefefe
| 194746 ||  || — || December 18, 2001 || Socorro || LINEAR || — || align=right | 1.7 km || 
|-id=747 bgcolor=#fefefe
| 194747 ||  || — || December 18, 2001 || Socorro || LINEAR || NYS || align=right data-sort-value="0.70" | 700 m || 
|-id=748 bgcolor=#fefefe
| 194748 ||  || — || December 18, 2001 || Socorro || LINEAR || NYS || align=right data-sort-value="0.96" | 960 m || 
|-id=749 bgcolor=#fefefe
| 194749 ||  || — || December 18, 2001 || Socorro || LINEAR || MAS || align=right | 1.3 km || 
|-id=750 bgcolor=#fefefe
| 194750 ||  || — || December 18, 2001 || Socorro || LINEAR || NYS || align=right data-sort-value="0.95" | 950 m || 
|-id=751 bgcolor=#fefefe
| 194751 ||  || — || December 18, 2001 || Socorro || LINEAR || — || align=right | 1.3 km || 
|-id=752 bgcolor=#fefefe
| 194752 ||  || — || December 18, 2001 || Socorro || LINEAR || — || align=right | 1.5 km || 
|-id=753 bgcolor=#fefefe
| 194753 ||  || — || December 18, 2001 || Socorro || LINEAR || MAS || align=right | 1.3 km || 
|-id=754 bgcolor=#fefefe
| 194754 ||  || — || December 18, 2001 || Socorro || LINEAR || — || align=right | 1.3 km || 
|-id=755 bgcolor=#E9E9E9
| 194755 ||  || — || December 18, 2001 || Socorro || LINEAR || — || align=right | 1.8 km || 
|-id=756 bgcolor=#fefefe
| 194756 ||  || — || December 18, 2001 || Socorro || LINEAR || — || align=right | 2.5 km || 
|-id=757 bgcolor=#fefefe
| 194757 ||  || — || December 18, 2001 || Socorro || LINEAR || — || align=right | 1.2 km || 
|-id=758 bgcolor=#fefefe
| 194758 ||  || — || December 18, 2001 || Socorro || LINEAR || — || align=right | 1.5 km || 
|-id=759 bgcolor=#fefefe
| 194759 ||  || — || December 18, 2001 || Socorro || LINEAR || NYS || align=right data-sort-value="0.97" | 970 m || 
|-id=760 bgcolor=#fefefe
| 194760 ||  || — || December 18, 2001 || Socorro || LINEAR || — || align=right | 1.3 km || 
|-id=761 bgcolor=#fefefe
| 194761 ||  || — || December 18, 2001 || Socorro || LINEAR || — || align=right | 1.1 km || 
|-id=762 bgcolor=#fefefe
| 194762 ||  || — || December 18, 2001 || Socorro || LINEAR || — || align=right | 2.7 km || 
|-id=763 bgcolor=#fefefe
| 194763 ||  || — || December 18, 2001 || Socorro || LINEAR || — || align=right | 1.7 km || 
|-id=764 bgcolor=#fefefe
| 194764 ||  || — || December 18, 2001 || Socorro || LINEAR || NYS || align=right | 1.1 km || 
|-id=765 bgcolor=#fefefe
| 194765 ||  || — || December 18, 2001 || Socorro || LINEAR || NYS || align=right | 1.5 km || 
|-id=766 bgcolor=#fefefe
| 194766 ||  || — || December 18, 2001 || Socorro || LINEAR || — || align=right | 1.2 km || 
|-id=767 bgcolor=#fefefe
| 194767 ||  || — || December 18, 2001 || Socorro || LINEAR || NYS || align=right | 1.5 km || 
|-id=768 bgcolor=#fefefe
| 194768 ||  || — || December 18, 2001 || Socorro || LINEAR || NYS || align=right data-sort-value="0.95" | 950 m || 
|-id=769 bgcolor=#fefefe
| 194769 ||  || — || December 18, 2001 || Socorro || LINEAR || NYS || align=right data-sort-value="0.92" | 920 m || 
|-id=770 bgcolor=#fefefe
| 194770 ||  || — || December 18, 2001 || Socorro || LINEAR || NYS || align=right | 1.2 km || 
|-id=771 bgcolor=#fefefe
| 194771 ||  || — || December 18, 2001 || Socorro || LINEAR || NYS || align=right data-sort-value="0.84" | 840 m || 
|-id=772 bgcolor=#fefefe
| 194772 ||  || — || December 18, 2001 || Socorro || LINEAR || — || align=right | 1.5 km || 
|-id=773 bgcolor=#fefefe
| 194773 ||  || — || December 18, 2001 || Socorro || LINEAR || — || align=right | 2.9 km || 
|-id=774 bgcolor=#fefefe
| 194774 ||  || — || December 18, 2001 || Socorro || LINEAR || MAS || align=right | 1.4 km || 
|-id=775 bgcolor=#fefefe
| 194775 ||  || — || December 18, 2001 || Socorro || LINEAR || V || align=right data-sort-value="0.85" | 850 m || 
|-id=776 bgcolor=#fefefe
| 194776 ||  || — || December 18, 2001 || Socorro || LINEAR || NYS || align=right data-sort-value="0.88" | 880 m || 
|-id=777 bgcolor=#fefefe
| 194777 ||  || — || December 18, 2001 || Socorro || LINEAR || NYS || align=right data-sort-value="0.87" | 870 m || 
|-id=778 bgcolor=#fefefe
| 194778 ||  || — || December 18, 2001 || Socorro || LINEAR || V || align=right | 1.5 km || 
|-id=779 bgcolor=#fefefe
| 194779 ||  || — || December 18, 2001 || Socorro || LINEAR || NYS || align=right | 1.3 km || 
|-id=780 bgcolor=#fefefe
| 194780 ||  || — || December 18, 2001 || Socorro || LINEAR || MAS || align=right | 1.4 km || 
|-id=781 bgcolor=#fefefe
| 194781 ||  || — || December 18, 2001 || Socorro || LINEAR || KLI || align=right | 2.7 km || 
|-id=782 bgcolor=#fefefe
| 194782 ||  || — || December 18, 2001 || Socorro || LINEAR || FLO || align=right | 1.2 km || 
|-id=783 bgcolor=#fefefe
| 194783 ||  || — || December 18, 2001 || Socorro || LINEAR || NYS || align=right | 1.0 km || 
|-id=784 bgcolor=#fefefe
| 194784 ||  || — || December 18, 2001 || Socorro || LINEAR || — || align=right | 1.6 km || 
|-id=785 bgcolor=#fefefe
| 194785 ||  || — || December 18, 2001 || Socorro || LINEAR || — || align=right | 1.3 km || 
|-id=786 bgcolor=#fefefe
| 194786 ||  || — || December 18, 2001 || Socorro || LINEAR || — || align=right | 1.4 km || 
|-id=787 bgcolor=#fefefe
| 194787 ||  || — || December 18, 2001 || Socorro || LINEAR || NYS || align=right | 1.3 km || 
|-id=788 bgcolor=#fefefe
| 194788 ||  || — || December 18, 2001 || Socorro || LINEAR || MAS || align=right | 1.1 km || 
|-id=789 bgcolor=#fefefe
| 194789 ||  || — || December 18, 2001 || Socorro || LINEAR || — || align=right | 1.2 km || 
|-id=790 bgcolor=#d6d6d6
| 194790 ||  || — || December 18, 2001 || Socorro || LINEAR || ULA7:4 || align=right | 11 km || 
|-id=791 bgcolor=#fefefe
| 194791 ||  || — || December 18, 2001 || Socorro || LINEAR || NYS || align=right | 3.0 km || 
|-id=792 bgcolor=#fefefe
| 194792 ||  || — || December 18, 2001 || Socorro || LINEAR || V || align=right | 1.1 km || 
|-id=793 bgcolor=#fefefe
| 194793 ||  || — || December 18, 2001 || Socorro || LINEAR || MAS || align=right | 1.0 km || 
|-id=794 bgcolor=#fefefe
| 194794 ||  || — || December 17, 2001 || Palomar || NEAT || NYS || align=right | 1.3 km || 
|-id=795 bgcolor=#fefefe
| 194795 ||  || — || December 17, 2001 || Palomar || NEAT || NYS || align=right data-sort-value="0.87" | 870 m || 
|-id=796 bgcolor=#fefefe
| 194796 ||  || — || December 17, 2001 || Palomar || NEAT || — || align=right | 1.1 km || 
|-id=797 bgcolor=#fefefe
| 194797 ||  || — || December 17, 2001 || Socorro || LINEAR || V || align=right data-sort-value="0.99" | 990 m || 
|-id=798 bgcolor=#fefefe
| 194798 ||  || — || December 17, 2001 || Socorro || LINEAR || — || align=right | 2.3 km || 
|-id=799 bgcolor=#fefefe
| 194799 ||  || — || December 17, 2001 || Socorro || LINEAR || ERI || align=right | 2.5 km || 
|-id=800 bgcolor=#fefefe
| 194800 ||  || — || December 17, 2001 || Socorro || LINEAR || MAS || align=right | 1.0 km || 
|}

194801–194900 

|-bgcolor=#fefefe
| 194801 ||  || — || December 17, 2001 || Socorro || LINEAR || — || align=right | 1.6 km || 
|-id=802 bgcolor=#fefefe
| 194802 ||  || — || December 17, 2001 || Socorro || LINEAR || NYS || align=right data-sort-value="0.99" | 990 m || 
|-id=803 bgcolor=#fefefe
| 194803 ||  || — || December 17, 2001 || Socorro || LINEAR || — || align=right | 1.4 km || 
|-id=804 bgcolor=#fefefe
| 194804 ||  || — || December 17, 2001 || Socorro || LINEAR || NYS || align=right | 1.0 km || 
|-id=805 bgcolor=#fefefe
| 194805 ||  || — || December 17, 2001 || Socorro || LINEAR || — || align=right | 1.8 km || 
|-id=806 bgcolor=#fefefe
| 194806 ||  || — || December 17, 2001 || Socorro || LINEAR || MAS || align=right | 1.0 km || 
|-id=807 bgcolor=#E9E9E9
| 194807 ||  || — || December 17, 2001 || Socorro || LINEAR || — || align=right | 1.8 km || 
|-id=808 bgcolor=#fefefe
| 194808 ||  || — || December 17, 2001 || Socorro || LINEAR || — || align=right | 1.4 km || 
|-id=809 bgcolor=#fefefe
| 194809 ||  || — || December 17, 2001 || Socorro || LINEAR || NYS || align=right data-sort-value="0.94" | 940 m || 
|-id=810 bgcolor=#fefefe
| 194810 ||  || — || December 17, 2001 || Socorro || LINEAR || — || align=right | 1.4 km || 
|-id=811 bgcolor=#fefefe
| 194811 ||  || — || December 17, 2001 || Socorro || LINEAR || NYS || align=right data-sort-value="0.86" | 860 m || 
|-id=812 bgcolor=#fefefe
| 194812 ||  || — || December 17, 2001 || Socorro || LINEAR || — || align=right | 2.9 km || 
|-id=813 bgcolor=#fefefe
| 194813 ||  || — || December 18, 2001 || Socorro || LINEAR || NYS || align=right | 1.5 km || 
|-id=814 bgcolor=#fefefe
| 194814 ||  || — || December 18, 2001 || Socorro || LINEAR || NYS || align=right | 1.2 km || 
|-id=815 bgcolor=#E9E9E9
| 194815 ||  || — || December 18, 2001 || Anderson Mesa || LONEOS || — || align=right | 2.4 km || 
|-id=816 bgcolor=#fefefe
| 194816 ||  || — || December 17, 2001 || Socorro || LINEAR || NYS || align=right data-sort-value="0.85" | 850 m || 
|-id=817 bgcolor=#fefefe
| 194817 ||  || — || December 18, 2001 || Socorro || LINEAR || NYS || align=right | 1.5 km || 
|-id=818 bgcolor=#fefefe
| 194818 ||  || — || December 18, 2001 || Socorro || LINEAR || NYS || align=right | 1.4 km || 
|-id=819 bgcolor=#fefefe
| 194819 ||  || — || December 18, 2001 || Socorro || LINEAR || NYS || align=right | 1.7 km || 
|-id=820 bgcolor=#fefefe
| 194820 ||  || — || December 18, 2001 || Socorro || LINEAR || — || align=right | 1.5 km || 
|-id=821 bgcolor=#fefefe
| 194821 ||  || — || December 20, 2001 || Socorro || LINEAR || — || align=right | 2.2 km || 
|-id=822 bgcolor=#fefefe
| 194822 ||  || — || December 17, 2001 || Socorro || LINEAR || FLO || align=right | 1.2 km || 
|-id=823 bgcolor=#fefefe
| 194823 ||  || — || December 17, 2001 || Socorro || LINEAR || V || align=right | 1.1 km || 
|-id=824 bgcolor=#fefefe
| 194824 ||  || — || December 17, 2001 || Socorro || LINEAR || — || align=right | 1.0 km || 
|-id=825 bgcolor=#fefefe
| 194825 ||  || — || December 17, 2001 || Socorro || LINEAR || SUL || align=right | 3.4 km || 
|-id=826 bgcolor=#fefefe
| 194826 ||  || — || December 17, 2001 || Socorro || LINEAR || — || align=right | 3.2 km || 
|-id=827 bgcolor=#fefefe
| 194827 ||  || — || December 17, 2001 || Socorro || LINEAR || — || align=right | 1.4 km || 
|-id=828 bgcolor=#fefefe
| 194828 ||  || — || December 18, 2001 || Socorro || LINEAR || — || align=right | 1.7 km || 
|-id=829 bgcolor=#fefefe
| 194829 ||  || — || December 19, 2001 || Socorro || LINEAR || — || align=right | 2.6 km || 
|-id=830 bgcolor=#fefefe
| 194830 ||  || — || December 17, 2001 || Socorro || LINEAR || V || align=right | 1.1 km || 
|-id=831 bgcolor=#fefefe
| 194831 ||  || — || December 17, 2001 || Socorro || LINEAR || — || align=right | 1.3 km || 
|-id=832 bgcolor=#fefefe
| 194832 ||  || — || December 19, 2001 || Palomar || NEAT || — || align=right | 1.2 km || 
|-id=833 bgcolor=#E9E9E9
| 194833 ||  || — || December 19, 2001 || Palomar || NEAT || — || align=right | 2.3 km || 
|-id=834 bgcolor=#fefefe
| 194834 ||  || — || December 20, 2001 || Palomar || NEAT || — || align=right | 1.6 km || 
|-id=835 bgcolor=#fefefe
| 194835 ||  || — || December 18, 2001 || Apache Point || SDSS || NYS || align=right | 1.0 km || 
|-id=836 bgcolor=#fefefe
| 194836 ||  || — || December 17, 2001 || Socorro || LINEAR || — || align=right | 2.3 km || 
|-id=837 bgcolor=#fefefe
| 194837 || 2002 AJ || — || January 4, 2002 || San Marcello || M. Tombelli, A. Boattini || — || align=right | 1.3 km || 
|-id=838 bgcolor=#fefefe
| 194838 ||  || — || January 8, 2002 || Oizumi || T. Kobayashi || — || align=right | 1.6 km || 
|-id=839 bgcolor=#E9E9E9
| 194839 ||  || — || January 5, 2002 || Socorro || LINEAR || — || align=right | 4.5 km || 
|-id=840 bgcolor=#fefefe
| 194840 ||  || — || January 4, 2002 || Palomar || NEAT || — || align=right | 1.4 km || 
|-id=841 bgcolor=#fefefe
| 194841 ||  || — || January 5, 2002 || Haleakala || NEAT || — || align=right | 1.2 km || 
|-id=842 bgcolor=#fefefe
| 194842 ||  || — || January 11, 2002 || Desert Eagle || W. K. Y. Yeung || NYS || align=right | 1.2 km || 
|-id=843 bgcolor=#fefefe
| 194843 ||  || — || January 10, 2002 || Campo Imperatore || CINEOS || NYS || align=right | 1.2 km || 
|-id=844 bgcolor=#fefefe
| 194844 ||  || — || January 11, 2002 || Campo Imperatore || CINEOS || MAS || align=right data-sort-value="0.96" | 960 m || 
|-id=845 bgcolor=#fefefe
| 194845 ||  || — || January 4, 2002 || Haleakala || NEAT || — || align=right | 1.5 km || 
|-id=846 bgcolor=#fefefe
| 194846 ||  || — || January 5, 2002 || Haleakala || NEAT || V || align=right | 1.2 km || 
|-id=847 bgcolor=#fefefe
| 194847 ||  || — || January 15, 2002 || Socorro || LINEAR || — || align=right | 1.3 km || 
|-id=848 bgcolor=#fefefe
| 194848 ||  || — || January 13, 2002 || Oizumi || T. Kobayashi || — || align=right | 2.5 km || 
|-id=849 bgcolor=#fefefe
| 194849 ||  || — || January 6, 2002 || Palomar || NEAT || — || align=right | 3.1 km || 
|-id=850 bgcolor=#fefefe
| 194850 ||  || — || January 6, 2002 || Haleakala || NEAT || NYS || align=right | 1.0 km || 
|-id=851 bgcolor=#fefefe
| 194851 ||  || — || January 8, 2002 || Palomar || NEAT || — || align=right | 3.8 km || 
|-id=852 bgcolor=#E9E9E9
| 194852 ||  || — || January 8, 2002 || Palomar || NEAT || — || align=right | 1.7 km || 
|-id=853 bgcolor=#E9E9E9
| 194853 ||  || — || January 8, 2002 || Palomar || NEAT || — || align=right | 2.6 km || 
|-id=854 bgcolor=#fefefe
| 194854 ||  || — || January 8, 2002 || Palomar || NEAT || — || align=right | 1.5 km || 
|-id=855 bgcolor=#E9E9E9
| 194855 ||  || — || January 7, 2002 || Anderson Mesa || LONEOS || — || align=right | 2.0 km || 
|-id=856 bgcolor=#fefefe
| 194856 ||  || — || January 7, 2002 || Anderson Mesa || LONEOS || V || align=right | 1.3 km || 
|-id=857 bgcolor=#fefefe
| 194857 ||  || — || January 8, 2002 || Socorro || LINEAR || PHO || align=right | 4.3 km || 
|-id=858 bgcolor=#fefefe
| 194858 ||  || — || January 10, 2002 || Bergisch Gladbach || W. Bickel || NYS || align=right | 1.3 km || 
|-id=859 bgcolor=#fefefe
| 194859 ||  || — || January 8, 2002 || Socorro || LINEAR || MAS || align=right | 1.1 km || 
|-id=860 bgcolor=#d6d6d6
| 194860 ||  || — || January 9, 2002 || Socorro || LINEAR || SHU3:2 || align=right | 10 km || 
|-id=861 bgcolor=#fefefe
| 194861 ||  || — || January 9, 2002 || Socorro || LINEAR || V || align=right | 1.1 km || 
|-id=862 bgcolor=#fefefe
| 194862 ||  || — || January 9, 2002 || Socorro || LINEAR || V || align=right | 1.3 km || 
|-id=863 bgcolor=#fefefe
| 194863 ||  || — || January 9, 2002 || Socorro || LINEAR || NYS || align=right | 1.1 km || 
|-id=864 bgcolor=#fefefe
| 194864 ||  || — || January 9, 2002 || Socorro || LINEAR || FLO || align=right | 1.1 km || 
|-id=865 bgcolor=#fefefe
| 194865 ||  || — || January 9, 2002 || Socorro || LINEAR || — || align=right | 1.2 km || 
|-id=866 bgcolor=#fefefe
| 194866 ||  || — || January 9, 2002 || Socorro || LINEAR || — || align=right | 1.3 km || 
|-id=867 bgcolor=#fefefe
| 194867 ||  || — || January 9, 2002 || Socorro || LINEAR || NYS || align=right data-sort-value="0.69" | 690 m || 
|-id=868 bgcolor=#fefefe
| 194868 ||  || — || January 9, 2002 || Socorro || LINEAR || NYS || align=right | 1.6 km || 
|-id=869 bgcolor=#E9E9E9
| 194869 ||  || — || January 9, 2002 || Socorro || LINEAR || — || align=right | 2.4 km || 
|-id=870 bgcolor=#fefefe
| 194870 ||  || — || January 9, 2002 || Socorro || LINEAR || FLO || align=right | 1.1 km || 
|-id=871 bgcolor=#fefefe
| 194871 ||  || — || January 9, 2002 || Socorro || LINEAR || MAS || align=right | 1.4 km || 
|-id=872 bgcolor=#fefefe
| 194872 ||  || — || January 9, 2002 || Socorro || LINEAR || NYS || align=right data-sort-value="0.86" | 860 m || 
|-id=873 bgcolor=#fefefe
| 194873 ||  || — || January 9, 2002 || Socorro || LINEAR || NYS || align=right | 1.00 km || 
|-id=874 bgcolor=#E9E9E9
| 194874 ||  || — || January 9, 2002 || Socorro || LINEAR || — || align=right | 4.2 km || 
|-id=875 bgcolor=#fefefe
| 194875 ||  || — || January 9, 2002 || Socorro || LINEAR || — || align=right | 3.0 km || 
|-id=876 bgcolor=#E9E9E9
| 194876 ||  || — || January 9, 2002 || Socorro || LINEAR || — || align=right | 1.8 km || 
|-id=877 bgcolor=#fefefe
| 194877 ||  || — || January 9, 2002 || Socorro || LINEAR || NYS || align=right | 1.5 km || 
|-id=878 bgcolor=#E9E9E9
| 194878 ||  || — || January 13, 2002 || Kitt Peak || Spacewatch || — || align=right | 1.1 km || 
|-id=879 bgcolor=#fefefe
| 194879 ||  || — || January 8, 2002 || Socorro || LINEAR || — || align=right | 1.1 km || 
|-id=880 bgcolor=#fefefe
| 194880 ||  || — || January 8, 2002 || Socorro || LINEAR || MAS || align=right | 1.1 km || 
|-id=881 bgcolor=#fefefe
| 194881 ||  || — || January 8, 2002 || Socorro || LINEAR || MAS || align=right | 1.1 km || 
|-id=882 bgcolor=#fefefe
| 194882 ||  || — || January 8, 2002 || Socorro || LINEAR || MAS || align=right | 1.0 km || 
|-id=883 bgcolor=#fefefe
| 194883 ||  || — || January 8, 2002 || Socorro || LINEAR || — || align=right | 1.1 km || 
|-id=884 bgcolor=#fefefe
| 194884 ||  || — || January 8, 2002 || Socorro || LINEAR || NYS || align=right data-sort-value="0.91" | 910 m || 
|-id=885 bgcolor=#fefefe
| 194885 ||  || — || January 8, 2002 || Socorro || LINEAR || NYS || align=right | 1.2 km || 
|-id=886 bgcolor=#fefefe
| 194886 ||  || — || January 8, 2002 || Socorro || LINEAR || — || align=right | 1.1 km || 
|-id=887 bgcolor=#fefefe
| 194887 ||  || — || January 8, 2002 || Socorro || LINEAR || — || align=right | 1.3 km || 
|-id=888 bgcolor=#fefefe
| 194888 ||  || — || January 9, 2002 || Socorro || LINEAR || ERI || align=right | 2.4 km || 
|-id=889 bgcolor=#fefefe
| 194889 ||  || — || January 9, 2002 || Socorro || LINEAR || — || align=right | 1.2 km || 
|-id=890 bgcolor=#fefefe
| 194890 ||  || — || January 9, 2002 || Socorro || LINEAR || — || align=right | 1.6 km || 
|-id=891 bgcolor=#E9E9E9
| 194891 ||  || — || January 9, 2002 || Socorro || LINEAR || — || align=right | 3.0 km || 
|-id=892 bgcolor=#E9E9E9
| 194892 ||  || — || January 12, 2002 || Socorro || LINEAR || — || align=right | 3.3 km || 
|-id=893 bgcolor=#fefefe
| 194893 ||  || — || January 8, 2002 || Socorro || LINEAR || NYS || align=right | 1.5 km || 
|-id=894 bgcolor=#fefefe
| 194894 ||  || — || January 8, 2002 || Socorro || LINEAR || NYS || align=right data-sort-value="0.76" | 760 m || 
|-id=895 bgcolor=#fefefe
| 194895 ||  || — || January 8, 2002 || Socorro || LINEAR || — || align=right | 1.0 km || 
|-id=896 bgcolor=#fefefe
| 194896 ||  || — || January 8, 2002 || Socorro || LINEAR || NYS || align=right data-sort-value="0.96" | 960 m || 
|-id=897 bgcolor=#fefefe
| 194897 ||  || — || January 8, 2002 || Socorro || LINEAR || NYS || align=right | 1.1 km || 
|-id=898 bgcolor=#fefefe
| 194898 ||  || — || January 8, 2002 || Socorro || LINEAR || MAS || align=right | 1.1 km || 
|-id=899 bgcolor=#fefefe
| 194899 ||  || — || January 8, 2002 || Socorro || LINEAR || MAS || align=right | 1.0 km || 
|-id=900 bgcolor=#fefefe
| 194900 ||  || — || January 8, 2002 || Socorro || LINEAR || MAS || align=right data-sort-value="0.93" | 930 m || 
|}

194901–195000 

|-bgcolor=#E9E9E9
| 194901 ||  || — || January 8, 2002 || Socorro || LINEAR || — || align=right | 1.7 km || 
|-id=902 bgcolor=#fefefe
| 194902 ||  || — || January 8, 2002 || Socorro || LINEAR || — || align=right | 1.6 km || 
|-id=903 bgcolor=#fefefe
| 194903 ||  || — || January 9, 2002 || Socorro || LINEAR || NYS || align=right data-sort-value="0.85" | 850 m || 
|-id=904 bgcolor=#fefefe
| 194904 ||  || — || January 9, 2002 || Socorro || LINEAR || MAS || align=right data-sort-value="0.99" | 990 m || 
|-id=905 bgcolor=#fefefe
| 194905 ||  || — || January 9, 2002 || Socorro || LINEAR || MAS || align=right data-sort-value="0.99" | 990 m || 
|-id=906 bgcolor=#fefefe
| 194906 ||  || — || January 9, 2002 || Socorro || LINEAR || — || align=right | 1.1 km || 
|-id=907 bgcolor=#fefefe
| 194907 ||  || — || January 9, 2002 || Socorro || LINEAR || — || align=right | 1.2 km || 
|-id=908 bgcolor=#fefefe
| 194908 ||  || — || January 9, 2002 || Socorro || LINEAR || — || align=right | 1.5 km || 
|-id=909 bgcolor=#fefefe
| 194909 ||  || — || January 9, 2002 || Socorro || LINEAR || MAS || align=right | 1.4 km || 
|-id=910 bgcolor=#fefefe
| 194910 ||  || — || January 9, 2002 || Socorro || LINEAR || — || align=right | 1.6 km || 
|-id=911 bgcolor=#fefefe
| 194911 ||  || — || January 9, 2002 || Socorro || LINEAR || NYS || align=right | 1.1 km || 
|-id=912 bgcolor=#fefefe
| 194912 ||  || — || January 9, 2002 || Socorro || LINEAR || V || align=right | 1.4 km || 
|-id=913 bgcolor=#fefefe
| 194913 ||  || — || January 9, 2002 || Socorro || LINEAR || NYS || align=right | 1.2 km || 
|-id=914 bgcolor=#E9E9E9
| 194914 ||  || — || January 9, 2002 || Socorro || LINEAR || — || align=right | 2.1 km || 
|-id=915 bgcolor=#fefefe
| 194915 ||  || — || January 9, 2002 || Socorro || LINEAR || NYS || align=right data-sort-value="0.93" | 930 m || 
|-id=916 bgcolor=#fefefe
| 194916 ||  || — || January 9, 2002 || Socorro || LINEAR || NYS || align=right | 1.3 km || 
|-id=917 bgcolor=#fefefe
| 194917 ||  || — || January 9, 2002 || Socorro || LINEAR || — || align=right | 1.2 km || 
|-id=918 bgcolor=#fefefe
| 194918 ||  || — || January 9, 2002 || Socorro || LINEAR || — || align=right | 1.5 km || 
|-id=919 bgcolor=#fefefe
| 194919 ||  || — || January 9, 2002 || Socorro || LINEAR || NYS || align=right | 1.2 km || 
|-id=920 bgcolor=#fefefe
| 194920 ||  || — || January 9, 2002 || Socorro || LINEAR || — || align=right | 3.4 km || 
|-id=921 bgcolor=#fefefe
| 194921 ||  || — || January 9, 2002 || Socorro || LINEAR || NYS || align=right | 1.1 km || 
|-id=922 bgcolor=#fefefe
| 194922 ||  || — || January 11, 2002 || Socorro || LINEAR || H || align=right | 1.2 km || 
|-id=923 bgcolor=#fefefe
| 194923 ||  || — || January 12, 2002 || Socorro || LINEAR || V || align=right data-sort-value="0.84" | 840 m || 
|-id=924 bgcolor=#fefefe
| 194924 ||  || — || January 14, 2002 || Desert Eagle || W. K. Y. Yeung || NYS || align=right | 1.2 km || 
|-id=925 bgcolor=#E9E9E9
| 194925 ||  || — || January 14, 2002 || Desert Eagle || W. K. Y. Yeung || — || align=right | 4.2 km || 
|-id=926 bgcolor=#fefefe
| 194926 ||  || — || January 9, 2002 || Socorro || LINEAR || — || align=right | 1.5 km || 
|-id=927 bgcolor=#d6d6d6
| 194927 ||  || — || January 9, 2002 || Socorro || LINEAR || SHU3:2 || align=right | 8.0 km || 
|-id=928 bgcolor=#fefefe
| 194928 ||  || — || January 9, 2002 || Socorro || LINEAR || MAS || align=right | 1.2 km || 
|-id=929 bgcolor=#fefefe
| 194929 ||  || — || January 9, 2002 || Socorro || LINEAR || — || align=right | 3.0 km || 
|-id=930 bgcolor=#fefefe
| 194930 ||  || — || January 9, 2002 || Socorro || LINEAR || MAS || align=right data-sort-value="0.96" | 960 m || 
|-id=931 bgcolor=#fefefe
| 194931 ||  || — || January 9, 2002 || Socorro || LINEAR || — || align=right | 1.5 km || 
|-id=932 bgcolor=#fefefe
| 194932 ||  || — || January 12, 2002 || Socorro || LINEAR || — || align=right | 1.0 km || 
|-id=933 bgcolor=#fefefe
| 194933 ||  || — || January 13, 2002 || Socorro || LINEAR || — || align=right | 1.4 km || 
|-id=934 bgcolor=#fefefe
| 194934 ||  || — || January 13, 2002 || Socorro || LINEAR || MAS || align=right | 1.0 km || 
|-id=935 bgcolor=#fefefe
| 194935 ||  || — || January 13, 2002 || Socorro || LINEAR || MAS || align=right data-sort-value="0.75" | 750 m || 
|-id=936 bgcolor=#fefefe
| 194936 ||  || — || January 13, 2002 || Socorro || LINEAR || NYS || align=right data-sort-value="0.99" | 990 m || 
|-id=937 bgcolor=#E9E9E9
| 194937 ||  || — || January 14, 2002 || Socorro || LINEAR || — || align=right | 2.8 km || 
|-id=938 bgcolor=#fefefe
| 194938 ||  || — || January 14, 2002 || Socorro || LINEAR || — || align=right | 1.1 km || 
|-id=939 bgcolor=#fefefe
| 194939 ||  || — || January 14, 2002 || Socorro || LINEAR || MAS || align=right | 1.1 km || 
|-id=940 bgcolor=#fefefe
| 194940 ||  || — || January 14, 2002 || Socorro || LINEAR || NYS || align=right | 1.2 km || 
|-id=941 bgcolor=#fefefe
| 194941 ||  || — || January 14, 2002 || Socorro || LINEAR || NYS || align=right | 1.2 km || 
|-id=942 bgcolor=#fefefe
| 194942 ||  || — || January 14, 2002 || Socorro || LINEAR || — || align=right | 1.4 km || 
|-id=943 bgcolor=#fefefe
| 194943 ||  || — || January 14, 2002 || Socorro || LINEAR || — || align=right | 1.3 km || 
|-id=944 bgcolor=#E9E9E9
| 194944 ||  || — || January 14, 2002 || Socorro || LINEAR || — || align=right | 2.7 km || 
|-id=945 bgcolor=#fefefe
| 194945 ||  || — || January 14, 2002 || Socorro || LINEAR || — || align=right | 1.6 km || 
|-id=946 bgcolor=#E9E9E9
| 194946 ||  || — || January 13, 2002 || Socorro || LINEAR || — || align=right | 3.6 km || 
|-id=947 bgcolor=#E9E9E9
| 194947 ||  || — || January 13, 2002 || Socorro || LINEAR || — || align=right | 2.3 km || 
|-id=948 bgcolor=#fefefe
| 194948 ||  || — || January 13, 2002 || Socorro || LINEAR || NYS || align=right | 1.3 km || 
|-id=949 bgcolor=#fefefe
| 194949 ||  || — || January 13, 2002 || Socorro || LINEAR || — || align=right | 1.6 km || 
|-id=950 bgcolor=#E9E9E9
| 194950 ||  || — || January 13, 2002 || Socorro || LINEAR || MIT || align=right | 4.3 km || 
|-id=951 bgcolor=#fefefe
| 194951 ||  || — || January 13, 2002 || Socorro || LINEAR || NYS || align=right | 1.2 km || 
|-id=952 bgcolor=#fefefe
| 194952 ||  || — || January 13, 2002 || Socorro || LINEAR || — || align=right | 2.1 km || 
|-id=953 bgcolor=#fefefe
| 194953 ||  || — || January 13, 2002 || Socorro || LINEAR || V || align=right | 1.1 km || 
|-id=954 bgcolor=#fefefe
| 194954 ||  || — || January 13, 2002 || Socorro || LINEAR || — || align=right | 1.3 km || 
|-id=955 bgcolor=#fefefe
| 194955 ||  || — || January 14, 2002 || Socorro || LINEAR || MAS || align=right | 1.0 km || 
|-id=956 bgcolor=#fefefe
| 194956 ||  || — || January 14, 2002 || Socorro || LINEAR || — || align=right | 1.2 km || 
|-id=957 bgcolor=#fefefe
| 194957 ||  || — || January 15, 2002 || Socorro || LINEAR || V || align=right | 1.0 km || 
|-id=958 bgcolor=#fefefe
| 194958 ||  || — || January 14, 2002 || Socorro || LINEAR || — || align=right | 1.3 km || 
|-id=959 bgcolor=#fefefe
| 194959 ||  || — || January 14, 2002 || Socorro || LINEAR || MAS || align=right data-sort-value="0.90" | 900 m || 
|-id=960 bgcolor=#fefefe
| 194960 ||  || — || January 14, 2002 || Socorro || LINEAR || NYS || align=right | 1.1 km || 
|-id=961 bgcolor=#fefefe
| 194961 ||  || — || January 14, 2002 || Socorro || LINEAR || — || align=right | 1.6 km || 
|-id=962 bgcolor=#fefefe
| 194962 ||  || — || January 14, 2002 || Socorro || LINEAR || NYS || align=right data-sort-value="0.81" | 810 m || 
|-id=963 bgcolor=#fefefe
| 194963 ||  || — || January 14, 2002 || Socorro || LINEAR || NYS || align=right | 1.2 km || 
|-id=964 bgcolor=#fefefe
| 194964 ||  || — || January 14, 2002 || Socorro || LINEAR || NYS || align=right | 1.1 km || 
|-id=965 bgcolor=#fefefe
| 194965 ||  || — || January 14, 2002 || Socorro || LINEAR || MAS || align=right | 1.3 km || 
|-id=966 bgcolor=#fefefe
| 194966 ||  || — || January 14, 2002 || Socorro || LINEAR || — || align=right data-sort-value="0.94" | 940 m || 
|-id=967 bgcolor=#fefefe
| 194967 ||  || — || January 14, 2002 || Socorro || LINEAR || MAS || align=right | 1.7 km || 
|-id=968 bgcolor=#E9E9E9
| 194968 ||  || — || January 14, 2002 || Socorro || LINEAR || — || align=right | 3.7 km || 
|-id=969 bgcolor=#E9E9E9
| 194969 ||  || — || January 14, 2002 || Socorro || LINEAR || — || align=right | 2.0 km || 
|-id=970 bgcolor=#E9E9E9
| 194970 Márai ||  ||  || January 13, 2002 || Piszkéstető || K. Sárneczky, Z. Heiner || — || align=right | 1.9 km || 
|-id=971 bgcolor=#fefefe
| 194971 ||  || — || January 5, 2002 || Palomar || NEAT || — || align=right | 1.4 km || 
|-id=972 bgcolor=#fefefe
| 194972 ||  || — || January 8, 2002 || Socorro || LINEAR || MAS || align=right | 1.2 km || 
|-id=973 bgcolor=#E9E9E9
| 194973 ||  || — || January 8, 2002 || Socorro || LINEAR || — || align=right | 3.2 km || 
|-id=974 bgcolor=#E9E9E9
| 194974 ||  || — || January 10, 2002 || Palomar || NEAT || JUN || align=right | 4.8 km || 
|-id=975 bgcolor=#fefefe
| 194975 ||  || — || January 11, 2002 || Desert Eagle || W. K. Y. Yeung || MAS || align=right data-sort-value="0.98" | 980 m || 
|-id=976 bgcolor=#fefefe
| 194976 ||  || — || January 9, 2002 || Socorro || LINEAR || MAS || align=right data-sort-value="0.80" | 800 m || 
|-id=977 bgcolor=#E9E9E9
| 194977 ||  || — || January 13, 2002 || Socorro || LINEAR || — || align=right | 3.0 km || 
|-id=978 bgcolor=#fefefe
| 194978 ||  || — || January 13, 2002 || Socorro || LINEAR || MAS || align=right data-sort-value="0.82" | 820 m || 
|-id=979 bgcolor=#d6d6d6
| 194979 ||  || — || January 11, 2002 || Cima Ekar || ADAS || — || align=right | 4.2 km || 
|-id=980 bgcolor=#E9E9E9
| 194980 ||  || — || January 12, 2002 || Kitt Peak || Spacewatch || — || align=right | 1.3 km || 
|-id=981 bgcolor=#E9E9E9
| 194981 ||  || — || January 12, 2002 || Kitt Peak || Spacewatch || — || align=right | 1.4 km || 
|-id=982 bgcolor=#fefefe
| 194982 Furia || 2002 BH ||  || January 19, 2002 || Schiaparelli || L. Buzzi || — || align=right | 1.9 km || 
|-id=983 bgcolor=#E9E9E9
| 194983 || 2002 BK || — || January 18, 2002 || Powell || Powell Obs. || — || align=right | 2.0 km || 
|-id=984 bgcolor=#E9E9E9
| 194984 ||  || — || January 19, 2002 || Desert Eagle || W. K. Y. Yeung || — || align=right | 2.0 km || 
|-id=985 bgcolor=#fefefe
| 194985 ||  || — || January 20, 2002 || Desert Eagle || W. K. Y. Yeung || NYS || align=right | 1.2 km || 
|-id=986 bgcolor=#fefefe
| 194986 ||  || — || January 19, 2002 || Desert Eagle || W. K. Y. Yeung || NYS || align=right data-sort-value="0.87" | 870 m || 
|-id=987 bgcolor=#fefefe
| 194987 ||  || — || January 18, 2002 || Socorro || LINEAR || — || align=right | 2.9 km || 
|-id=988 bgcolor=#E9E9E9
| 194988 ||  || — || January 18, 2002 || Socorro || LINEAR || KON || align=right | 4.3 km || 
|-id=989 bgcolor=#d6d6d6
| 194989 ||  || — || January 18, 2002 || Socorro || LINEAR || HIL3:2 || align=right | 7.4 km || 
|-id=990 bgcolor=#fefefe
| 194990 ||  || — || January 18, 2002 || Socorro || LINEAR || NYS || align=right data-sort-value="0.96" | 960 m || 
|-id=991 bgcolor=#fefefe
| 194991 ||  || — || January 18, 2002 || Socorro || LINEAR || NYS || align=right | 1.3 km || 
|-id=992 bgcolor=#fefefe
| 194992 ||  || — || January 18, 2002 || Socorro || LINEAR || MAS || align=right | 1.2 km || 
|-id=993 bgcolor=#fefefe
| 194993 ||  || — || January 19, 2002 || Socorro || LINEAR || MAS || align=right | 1.4 km || 
|-id=994 bgcolor=#E9E9E9
| 194994 ||  || — || January 19, 2002 || Socorro || LINEAR || — || align=right | 1.9 km || 
|-id=995 bgcolor=#E9E9E9
| 194995 ||  || — || January 19, 2002 || Socorro || LINEAR || — || align=right | 1.5 km || 
|-id=996 bgcolor=#E9E9E9
| 194996 ||  || — || January 19, 2002 || Socorro || LINEAR || — || align=right | 1.6 km || 
|-id=997 bgcolor=#fefefe
| 194997 ||  || — || January 20, 2002 || Kitt Peak || Spacewatch || MAS || align=right data-sort-value="0.98" | 980 m || 
|-id=998 bgcolor=#fefefe
| 194998 ||  || — || January 21, 2002 || Socorro || LINEAR || — || align=right | 2.5 km || 
|-id=999 bgcolor=#fefefe
| 194999 ||  || — || January 20, 2002 || Anderson Mesa || LONEOS || KLI || align=right | 2.9 km || 
|-id=000 bgcolor=#fefefe
| 195000 ||  || — || January 20, 2002 || Anderson Mesa || LONEOS || V || align=right | 1.3 km || 
|}

References

External links 
 Discovery Circumstances: Numbered Minor Planets (190001)–(195000) (IAU Minor Planet Center)

0194